= 2008 German Grand Prix =

10th round of the 2008 Formula One season

Coordinates: 49°19′40″N 8°33′57″E

Race 10 of 18 in the 2008 Formula One World Championship
← Previous race	Next race →

Race details
- Date: 20 July 2008
- Official name: Formula 1 Grosser Preis Santander von Deutschland 2008
- Location: Hockenheimring, Hockenheim, Germany
- Course: Permanent racing facility
- Course length: 4.574 km (2.842 miles)
- Distance: 67 laps, 306.458 km (190.424 miles)
- Weather: Cloudy, later sunny

Pole position
Driver	(United Kingdom) Lewis Hamilton	McLaren-Mercedes
- Time: 1:15.666

Fastest lap
Driver	(Germany) Nick Heidfeld	BMW Sauber
- Time: 1:15.987 on lap 52

Podium
First	(United Kingdom) Lewis Hamilton	McLaren-Mercedes
Second	(Brazil) Nelson Piquet Jr.	Renault
Third	(Brazil) Felipe Massa	Ferrari

The 2008 German Grand Prix (formally the Formula 1 Grosser Preis Santander von Deutschland 2008) was a Formula One motor race held on 20 July 2008 at the Hockenheimring, Hockenheim, Germany. It was the 10th race of the 2008 Formula One World Championship and was contested over 67 laps. It was won by Lewis Hamilton for the McLaren team after starting from pole position. Nelson Piquet Jr. finished second for Renault, with Felipe Massa third for Ferrari.

Hamilton maintained his startline advantage and led until he made his first pit stop on lap 18. As other cars made their pit stops, Hamilton regained the lead on lap 22. On lap 36, Timo Glock crashed, and the race was neutralized by the deployment of the safety car. Hamilton, on a two-stop strategy, did not stop to get more fuel during this period, while all the cars around him did. Thus, when he did eventually stop on lap 50, he rejoined the race in fifth position. In the closing stages of the race, Hamilton first overtook his teammate Heikki Kovalainen, then Massa, and finally Piquet, whilst also gaining a position due to Nick Heidfeld's late pit stop. This allowed him to take the lead again on lap 60, which he maintained to win the race.

The victory was Hamilton's second consecutive win, having won the preceding British Grand Prix at Silverstone. The win also put him ahead of his two main rivals in the Drivers' Championship, Kimi Räikkönen (who finished sixth) and Massa, who were on equal points with him before the race. After the race he was four points ahead of Massa, and seven ahead of Räikkönen. In the Constructors' Championship, McLaren drew closer to the two teams ahead of them, BMW Sauber and Ferrari. Ferrari still led by 15 points from McLaren, and 12 from BMW, whose drivers – Nick Heidfeld and Robert Kubica – finished fourth and seventh respectively.

== Background ==
The Grand Prix was contested by 20 drivers, in ten teams of two. The teams, also known as "constructors", were Ferrari, McLaren-Mercedes, Renault, BMW Sauber, Honda, Force India, Toyota, Red Bull Racing, Williams and Toro Rosso. Tyre supplier Bridgestone selected the hard and medium tyres for the Grand Prix weekend. Prior to the race, Lewis Hamilton, Kimi Räikkönen, and Felipe Massa led the Drivers' Championship jointly, all with 48 points. Behind them was Robert Kubica in fourth with 46 points for BMW Sauber, and his teammate Nick Heidfeld in fifth with 36 points. In the Constructors' Championship, Ferrari were leading with 96 points, 14 points ahead of BMW Sauber, who at this stage were ahead of McLaren, despite Hamilton tying for the lead of the Drivers' World Championship. This was due to Heikki Kovalainen's low point score of 24. Toyota were fourth, with 25 points, ahead of Red Bull by one point, who in turn were one further point ahead of Renault.

Hamilton had won the preceding British Grand Prix by 68 seconds from Heidfeld and Honda's Rubens Barrichello. Of his championship rivals, Räikkönen had finished fourth, Kubica had retired, and Massa had had a nightmare of a race, spinning five times and finishing 13th. In the run-up to the German Grand Prix, Hamilton had tested the McLaren MP4-23's new front wing – introduced at the British Grand Prix – extensively in the team's simulator, and then during a pre-race test session at the Hockenheim circuit. Having honed the car's setup to his liking after initially finding the handling difficult, he used it in the race. Kovalainen was not as comfortable with the car's handling and ran a greater front wing angle to produce more downforce, at the expense of having to run larger radiators due to the reduced airflow produced over the car. This led to a slight reduction in his car's overall performance. In other technical developments, Ferrari introduced revised bargeboards, exhaust exits and an altered windscreen for its F2008 car. BMW Sauber added turning vanes to the top of its F1.08's nose, while Toyota removed some bodywork from its TF108's exhaust exits. Honda also introduced new bargeboards for its RA108 chassis. All of these changes were carried out with the aim of improving each car's aerodynamic performance.

== Practice ==
Three practice sessions were held before the Sunday race – two on Friday, and a third on Saturday. The Friday morning and afternoon sessions each lasted 90 minutes. The third session was held on Saturday morning and lasted an hour. During the first practice session the track was wet following early-morning rain, and shortly after the session started, further precipitation made the track even wetter, although it did begin to dry out as the session progressed. Hamilton was fastest in this session ahead of his teammate Kovalainen. The Ferraris of Massa and Räikkönen came third and fifth respectively, with Renault's Fernando Alonso sandwiched between them in fourth place. Kubica spun off the track and Sébastien Bourdais had a mechanical problem with his flywheel sensor towards the end of the session. Both ended up at the bottom of the timesheets as a result of these problems.

Friday's second session was held in dry conditions. Hamilton again set the fastest time. Massa and Räikkönen improved to second and third positions, pushing Kovalainen down to fourth. Mark Webber set the fifth-fastest time, after earlier having electrical and clutch problems with the car. Alonso, Nico Rosberg, Kubica, Heidfeld and David Coulthard made up the rest of the top ten. In the final practice session on Saturday – which was held in dry conditions – Kovalainen was fastest, ahead of Massa and teammate Hamilton. Alonso continued his strong practice form, finishing fourth, with Toro Rosso's Sebastian Vettel making it to fifth position. Kubica once again was at the bottom of the table, this time due to a transmission problem.

== Qualifying ==
"What a lap! My first run during [the third session of qualifying] wasn’t bad, but my final lap was very smooth and I expected to set an even better time. The wind made today's conditions quite tricky and sometimes it was difficult to stay on the racing line, particularly in the stadium section – where the wind seemed to change a couple of times. The team did a really good job to adjust to these conditions and to prepare the car perfectly. We’ve been fast and consistent all weekend, we have good pace, and I'm confident for tomorrow."

— Lewis Hamilton, following the third qualifying session.

The qualifying session on Saturday afternoon was split into three parts. The first part ran for 20 minutes, and cars that finished the session 16th or lower were eliminated from qualifying. The second part of qualifying lasted 15 minutes and eliminated cars that finished in positions 11 to 15. The final part of qualifying determined the positions from first to tenth, and decided pole position. Cars which failed to make the final session could refuel before the race, so ran lighter in those sessions. Cars which competed in the final session of qualifying were not allowed to refuel before the race, and as such carried more fuel than in the previous sessions.

Hamilton took pole position for the ninth time in his career with a lap time of 1:15.666, having beaten Massa by two-tenths of a second in his final lap of the third session. Kovalainen, coming back after an error during his first run, qualified third, with Jarno Trulli taking fourth position. Alonso and Räikkönen were close together in fifth and sixth positions, with just 0.004 seconds separating them. Kubica took a comfortable seventh, half a second quicker in the third session than eighth-placed Webber. Vettel and Coulthard completed the top ten. Timo Glock took 11th place on the grid for Toyota, seven places behind his teammate Trulli. He was immediately in front of compatriots Heidfeld and Rosberg. Jenson Button and Bourdais took 14th and 15th positions respectively. Both Heidfeld and Button later said that they suffered from tyre problems during the session.

Completing the field, Kazuki Nakajima was 16th, Nelson Piquet Jr. 17th, Rubens Barrichello 18th, whilst the Force Indias of Adrian Sutil and Giancarlo Fisichella brought up the rear of the grid in 19th and 20th positions. Piquet later complained that he was blocked during his first-session run by Vettel: "During my lap, Vettel was in front of me, which unsettled me a little, although the FIA felt that he did not impede me." Kovalainen was, however, penalized by the stewards and fined €5,000 for using a refuelling system during qualifying which had not been approved by the FIA.

=== Qualifying classification ===
Pos	No	Driver	Constructor	Part 1	Part 2	Part 3	Grid
1	22	(United Kingdom) Lewis Hamilton	McLaren-Mercedes	1:15.218	1:14.603	1:15.666	1
2	2	(Brazil) Felipe Massa	Ferrari	1:14.921	1:14.747	1:15.859	2
3	23	(Finland) Heikki Kovalainen	McLaren-Mercedes	1:15.476	1:14.855	1:16.143	3
4	11	(Italy) Jarno Trulli	Toyota	1:15.560	1:15.122	1:16.191	4
5	5	(Spain) Fernando Alonso	Renault	1:15.917	1:14.943	1:16.385	5
6	1	(Finland) Kimi Räikkönen	Ferrari	1:15.201	1:14.949	1:16.389	6
7	4	(Poland) Robert Kubica	BMW Sauber	1:15.985	1:15.109	1:16.521	7
8	10	(Australia) Mark Webber	Red Bull-Renault	1:15.900	1:15.481	1:17.014	8
9	15	(Germany) Sebastian Vettel	Toro Rosso-Ferrari	1:15.532	1:15.420	1:17.244	9
10	9	(United Kingdom) David Coulthard	Red Bull-Renault	1:15.975	1:15.338	1:17.503	10
11	12	(Germany) Timo Glock	Toyota	1:15.560	1:15.508		11
12	3	(Germany) Nick Heidfeld	BMW Sauber	1:15.596	1:15.581		12
13	7	(Germany) Nico Rosberg	Williams-Toyota	1:15.863	1:15.633		13
14	16	(United Kingdom) Jenson Button	Honda	1:15.993	1:15.701		14
15	14	(France) Sébastien Bourdais	Toro Rosso-Ferrari	1:15.927	1:15.858		15
16	8	(Japan) Kazuki Nakajima	Williams-Toyota	1:16.083			16
17	6	(Brazil) Nelson Piquet Jr.	Renault	1:16.189			17
18	17	(Brazil) Rubens Barrichello	Honda	1:16.246			18
19	20	(Germany) Adrian Sutil	Force India-Ferrari	1:16.657			19
20	21	(Italy) Giancarlo Fisichella	Force India-Ferrari	1:16.963			20

== Race ==
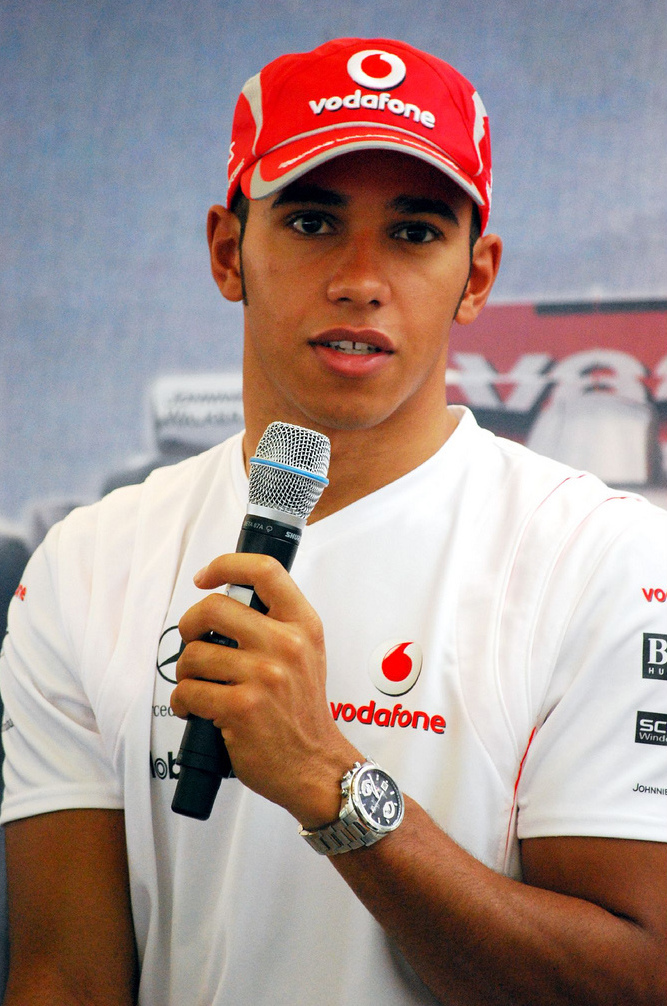
Lewis Hamilton won the race from pole position, overcoming a late race safety car period in the process.

At the start, Hamilton, Massa and Kovalainen all maintained their grid positions. Hamilton quickly began to pull away from the other cars, at the rate of about half a second per lap. Behind the leading trio, Kubica passed Räikkönen off the grid, and went on to pass both Alonso and Trulli at the hairpin (turn 4), when Alonso's own attempted pass on Trulli delayed both drivers. The fight for fourth position continued in the early stages of the race. Kubica ran wide at the final corner on lap four, impeding Trulli and therefore allowing Alonso to attempt an overtaking manoeuvre on the Toyota down the main straight. However, Trulli held on to his position, and Alonso was instead passed by Räikkönen, moving him down to sixth position. At the back of the field, Nakajima spun his Williams but recovered back onto the track and continued in the race.

At the first round of pit stops, Hamilton had a lead of nearly 20 seconds over Massa, and fuelled longer than all the other drivers in the points-scoring positions when he pitted on lap 18. Coming out of the pits, Hamilton made an error and was passed by Trulli. The two drivers then nearly collided at the hairpin, with Hamilton holding back for the rest of the lap waiting for Trulli to pit. Trulli's teammate Glock stayed out on the track longer than all of the other drivers except Barrichello and Piquet, meaning that when he pitted, he was actually in third position and rejoined the race in eighth. Hamilton regained the lead by lap 22 after Massa, Kovalainen, Trulli and Räikkönen made their pit stops, and had in the region of an 11-second lead over Massa at the half-way stage of the race. Behind the leaders, fourth-placed Kubica was beginning to catch Kovalainen in third, while Trulli, Räikkönen, Alonso and Vettel battled over the final four point-scoring places.

On the 36th lap, Glock's right-rear suspension failed coming out of the final corner. He spun through 180 degrees before hitting the pit wall with a strong rearward impact, with debris flying across the track. The car, pointing the wrong way, rolled to a stop on the grass. A dazed Glock extracted himself before being treated at the medical centre. The safety car was deployed after the accident. When the pit lane opened on lap 38, most drivers headed in, including all of the leaders except Hamilton. McLaren believed that Hamilton had enough fuel to stay out, the plan being for him to then rapidly pull away from his heavily fuelled rivals, after the safety car went in. Hamilton needed to build up enough of a lead to rejoin still in first position, following his final pit stop. This would prove to be very risky, as Massa rejoined in fourth position, fuelled to the finish.

Piquet, on a one-stop strategy after his poor qualifying performance, had fortuitously pitted immediately prior to the safety car's deployment and was also fuelled to the end of the race. Promoted to third place from 14th beforehand following the pit stops, he was set to take the lead once Hamilton and Heidfeld (who also had not pitted under the safety car conditions) pitted for their final stops. Further back, Vettel squeezed past Alonso at the pit exit, pushing him over the white line separating the pit lane exit from the track. Alonso complained over his radio but no action was taken against either driver. Meanwhile, Räikkönen dropped several places to 11th, having had to queue behind Massa at the second pit stops.

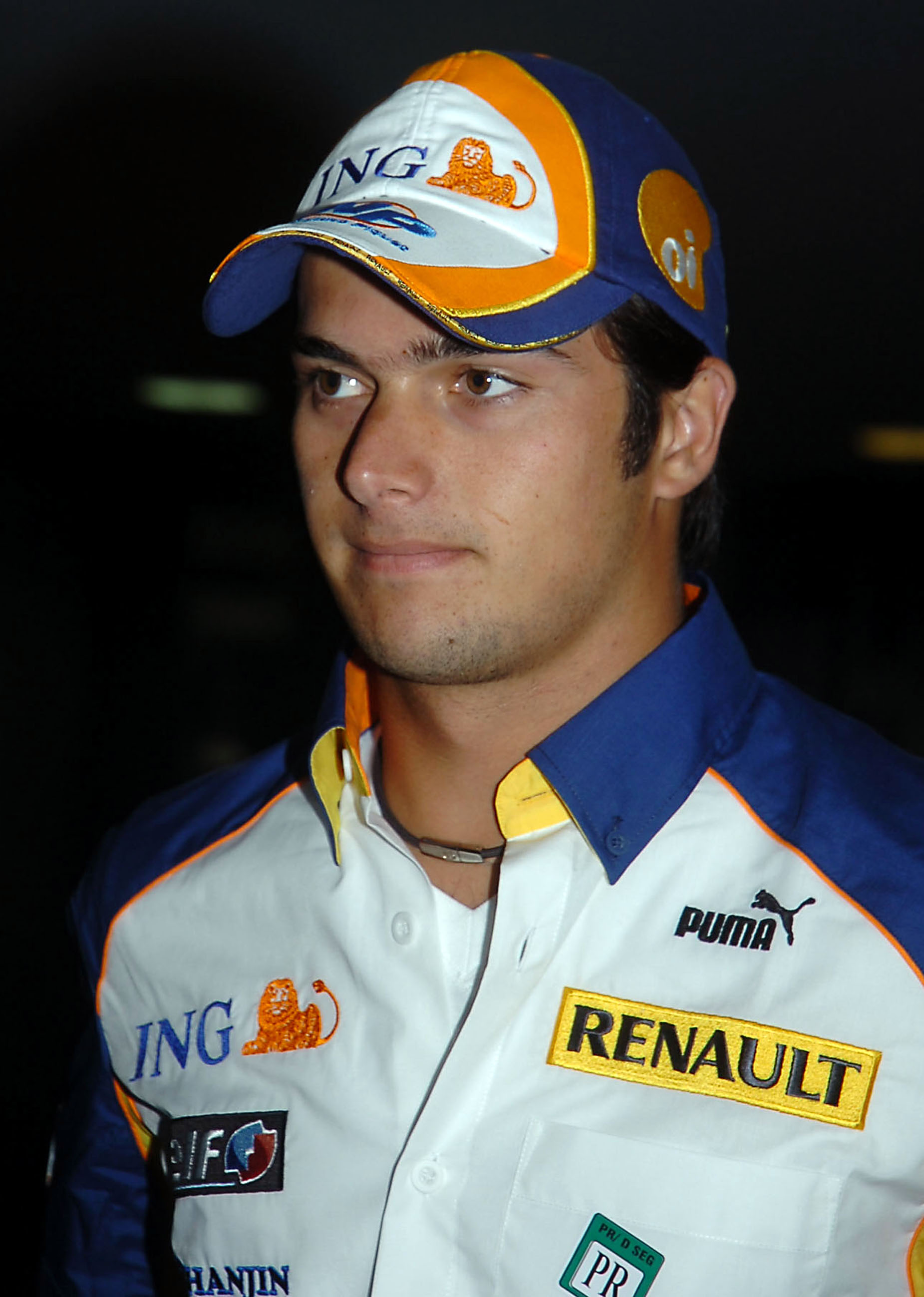
Nelson Piquet finished in second position, despite qualifying in 17th.

When the safety car came in on lap 42, Hamilton led, while Heidfeld and Piquet were running second and third. Behind them were Massa, Kubica, Kovalainen, Trulli, Vettel, Alonso, Webber, Rosberg and Räikkönen. Webber's Red Bull had been dripping oil for a couple of laps after picking up debris from Glock's crash, and on lap 40 he pulled out of the race. Räikkönen quickly passed Rosberg, and then overtook the squabbling Vettel and Alonso on the way down to the hairpin, while Hamilton desperately tried to pull away at the front. Räikkönen passed Trulli two laps later, while Kovalainen overtook Kubica for fifth place. Coulthard and Barrichello collided on the 48th lap with both cars pitting for repairs. Barrichello retired three laps later due to damage sustained as a result of the incident. Hamilton pitted on lap 50, coming out behind Heidfeld, Piquet, Massa and Kovalainen. Kovalainen let his teammate past at the hairpin one lap later, meaning that Hamilton was now fourth. On lap 52, Heidfeld set a new fastest lap time of 1:15.987. He was the only driver to go under one minute 16 seconds during the Grand Prix. At the end of the following lap, Heidfeld entered the pits with a sizeable gap over Piquet, returning to the field comfortably ahead of Kovalainen, but behind Hamilton.

Hamilton's speed allowed him to quickly catch Massa in second position, with Piquet in the lead by a further three seconds. On lap 57, Hamilton passed Massa at the hairpin. Massa appeared to have the inside line covered, but he was not fully committed to the line into the braking zone, giving Hamilton the chance to take second position. Three laps later, he used a similar overtaking move to overtake Piquet, although the Renault driver put up a greater fight than Massa had. Hamilton led easily to the finish, although Piquet kept within six seconds of him. Heidfeld threatened a slowing Massa in the last laps, while Räikkönen was able to pass Kubica for sixth place on lap 60.

Hamilton took the chequered flag first, while Piquet enthusiastically celebrated his drive from 17th to second, just 5.5 seconds behind. Massa held on to take third ahead of Heidfeld, Kovalainen, Räikkönen, and Kubica. Vettel secured eighth – the last points-scoring position – for Toro Rosso, ahead of Trulli in ninth, and Rosberg in 10th. Alonso finished 11th, ahead of Bourdais. Coulthard was 13th, Fisichella 14th, Nakajima 15th, Sutil 16th and Button was last of the classified finishers in 17th. A record of sixteen drivers finished on the lead lap, beating the previous highest number of fourteen at the 1999 Belgian Grand Prix.

=== Post-race ===
Following the podium ceremony, in which two Brazilian drivers participated for the first time since the 1991 Belgian Grand Prix, the top three finishers appeared in the obligatory press conference. Hamilton said that the decision to not make a pit stop during the safety car period was the team's decision: "We had two very comfortable, two very decent stints and the team opted for me to stay out. I guess they thought I could pull out a gap but it was a 23 second gap I needed and I only had seven laps or something, so I don't know how that worked out." Hamilton added that he felt that things looked good for the rest of the season, stating that "if we [McLaren] can continue with this momentum we have got we are looking very good".

Ron Dennis, McLaren's team principal, also commented on the pit stop decision:

The deployment of the Safety Car presented us with a difficult decision: should we or should we not bring Lewis in for a pitstop? We decided that, since he still had quite a lot of fuel on board, we would leave him out until lap 50. We'd expected the track to be cleared of debris a little faster than it was, which would have allowed the Safety Car to come in a bit earlier. As a result, Lewis was unable to rejoin the race in the lead.

Piquet was delighted with his drive to second after qualifying 17th, saying:

I am obviously very happy! After qualifying yesterday I was thinking that my weekend was over, but we opted for an aggressive strategy in the race and the team made some great decisions when the safety car came out. Then I had to concentrate to keep my pace up and look after my tyres as much as possible towards the end of the race. I knew that Lewis was much faster than me, so I did not want to take any pointless risks. This second place today is a great reward for the whole team.

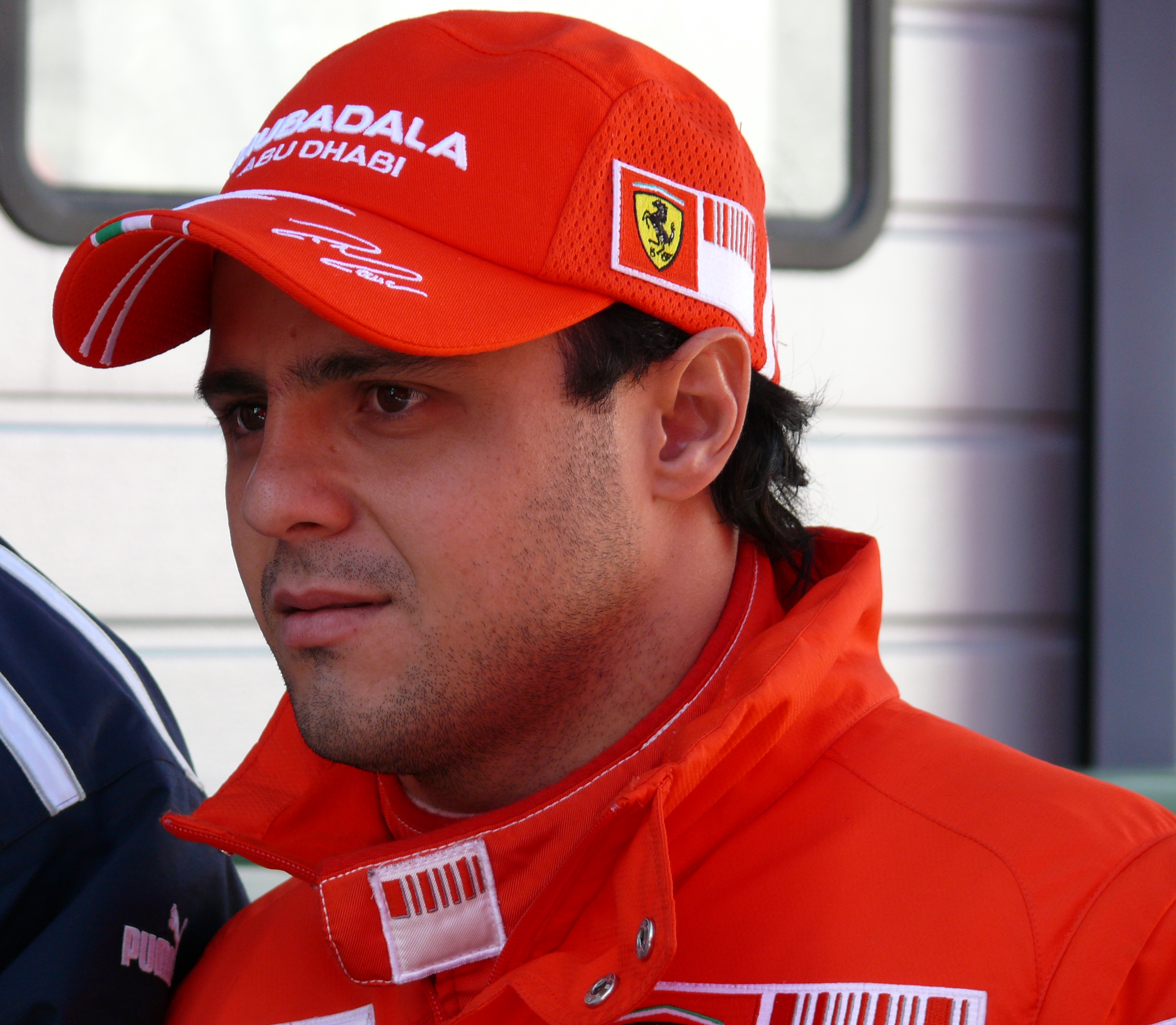
Felipe Massa was third after being unable to match Hamilton's pace.

Although Piquet's result was fortuitous, Renault Engineering Director, Pat Symonds, subsequently praised him for stepping up to the job of staying with the leaders in the final stint of the race. Meanwhile, Massa commented that his car was not in good order during the race: "It was just slow with difficult stability and also on braking I think I had a little problem as well and lost a lot of performance. I didn’t have the car to fight. I tried but it was not possible." Teammate Räikkönen also struggled with low grip and hot brakes for the duration of the race, while Kovalainen and Kubica had problems with their tyres.

Fisichella was penalised 25 seconds for unlapping lead cars during the safety car period, which dropped him from 14th to 16th position. The stewards issued the following statement about the decision: "While the safety car was deployed, the driver of car 21 [Fisichella] chose to enter the pits before 'Lapped cars may now overtake' was shown on the timing monitors. Having done so the driver of car 21 on leaving the pitlane should then not have unlapped himself."

The treatment of Glock after his crash caused Toyota some concern. Toyota did not think that normal FIA procedure had been followed. After crashes, drivers are normally taken out of the car in their seat, whereas Glock was unstrapped and then hauled out by the marshals. Glock stayed in hospital overnight for observation, but was released the next day with no injuries. Toyota subsequently confirmed that the failed suspension component had already completed a full race distance at the previous Grand Prix, and resolved to adjust its checking procedures.

The new gap between Hamilton and Massa in the Drivers' Championship after the race stood at four points in Hamilton's favour. In the Constructors' Championship, McLaren somewhat caught up on Ferrari, although the gap between the two teams was still sizeable at 19 points. McLaren were ten points behind BMW coming into the race and the deficit was reduced to three due to the race result.

=== Race classification ===
Pos	No	Driver	Constructor	Laps	Time/Retired	Grid	Points
1	22	(United Kingdom) Lewis Hamilton	McLaren-Mercedes	67	1:31:20.874	1	10
2	6	(Brazil) Nelson Piquet Jr.	Renault	67	+5.586	17	8
3	2	(Brazil) Felipe Massa	Ferrari	67	+9.339	2	6
4	3	(Germany) Nick Heidfeld	BMW Sauber	67	+9.825	12	5
5	23	(Finland) Heikki Kovalainen	McLaren-Mercedes	67	+12.411	3	4
6	1	(Finland) Kimi Räikkönen	Ferrari	67	+14.403	6	3
7	4	(Poland) Robert Kubica	BMW Sauber	67	+22.682	7	2
8	15	(Germany) Sebastian Vettel	Toro Rosso-Ferrari	67	+33.299	9	1
9	11	(Italy) Jarno Trulli	Toyota	67	+37.158	4	
10	7	(Germany) Nico Rosberg	Williams-Toyota	67	+37.625	13	
11	5	(Spain) Fernando Alonso	Renault	67	+38.600	5	
12	14	(France) Sébastien Bourdais	Toro Rosso-Ferrari	67	+39.111	15	
13	9	(United Kingdom) David Coulthard	Red Bull-Renault	67	+54.971	10	
14	8	(Japan) Kazuki Nakajima	Williams-Toyota	67	+1:00.003	16	
15	20	(Germany) Adrian Sutil	Force India-Ferrari	67	+1:09.488	19	
16	21	(Italy) Giancarlo Fisichella	Force India-Ferrari	67	+1:24.093^{1}	20	
17	16	(United Kingdom) Jenson Button	Honda	66	+1 Lap	14	
Ret	17	(Brazil) Rubens Barrichello	Honda	50	Collision damage	18	
Ret	10	(Australia) Mark Webber	Red Bull-Renault	40	Oil leak	8	
Ret	12	(Germany) Timo Glock	Toyota	35	Suspension/Crash	11	

Notes

- ^1 – Giancarlo Fisichella originally finished in 14th place, but received a 25-second time penalty for illegally overtaking while the safety car was on the track.

== Championship standings after the race ==
Drivers' Championship standings

Pos.	Driver	Points
1	(United Kingdom) Lewis Hamilton	58
2	(Brazil) Felipe Massa	54
3	(Finland) Kimi Räikkönen	51
4	(Poland) Robert Kubica	48
5	(Germany) Nick Heidfeld	41

Constructors' Championship standings

Pos.	Constructor	Points
1	(Italy) Ferrari	105
2	(Germany) BMW Sauber	89
3	(United Kingdom) McLaren-Mercedes	86
4	(Japan) Toyota	25
5	(Austria) Red Bull-Renault	24

- Note: Only the top five positions are included for both sets of standings.

== See also ==
- 2008 Hockenheimring GP2 Series round

Previous race: 2008 British Grand Prix	FIA Formula One World Championship; 2008 season	Next race: 2008 Hungarian Grand Prix
Previous race: 2006 German Grand Prix	German Grand Prix	Next race: 2009 German Grand Prix
