= Air distribution =

Air distribution may refer to:

- In Heating, ventilation, and air conditioning
  - Forced-air systems
  - Room air distribution
  - Underfloor air distribution
- More generally, ventilation includes both passive ventilation and active ventilation
- Special cases include:
  - Ventilation (firefighting)
  - Ventilation (mining)

It may also refer to the distributions of gases, aerosols, or heat in air.
