= Pressurization =

Application of pressure in a given situation or environment

Pressurization or pressurisation is the application of pressure in a given situation or environment.

== Examples ==
=== Industrial ===
Industrial equipment is often maintained at pressures above or below atmospheric.

=== Atmospheric ===
This is the process by which atmospheric pressure is maintained in an isolated or semi-isolated atmospheric environment (for instance, in an aircraft, or whilst scuba diving).

== See also ==
- Cabin pressurization
- Compressed air
- Decompression (diving)
- Decompression (physics)
- Gas compressor
- Category:Units of pressure
- Pressurisation ductwork
