= Diffuser (thermodynamics) =

Thermodynamic device

A diffuser is "a device for reducing the velocity and increasing the static pressure of a fluid passing through a system". The fluid's static pressure rise as it passes through a duct is commonly referred to as pressure recovery. In contrast, a nozzle is used to increase the discharge velocity and lower the pressure of a fluid passing through it.

Frictional effects during analysis can sometimes be important, but usually they are neglected. Ducts containing fluids flowing at low velocity can usually be analyzed using Bernoulli's principle. Analyzing ducts flowing at higher velocities with Mach numbers in excess of 0.3 usually require compressible flow relations.

A typical subsonic diffuser is a duct that increases in area in the direction of flow. As the area increases, fluid velocity decreases, and static pressure rises.

== Supersonic diffusers ==
A supersonic diffuser is a duct that decreases in area in the direction of flow which causes the fluid temperature, pressure, and density to increase, and velocity to decrease. These changes occur because the fluid is compressible. Shock waves may also play an important role in a supersonic diffuser.

== Applications ==
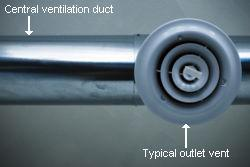
A round diffuser in an HVAC system

Diffusers are very common in heating, ventilating, and air-conditioning systems. Diffusers are used in both all-air and air-water HVAC systems, as part of room air distribution subsystems, and serve several purposes:

- To deliver both conditioning and ventilating air
- Evenly distribute the flow of air, in the desired directions
- To enhance mixing of room air into the primary air being discharged
- Often to cause the air jet(s) to attach to a ceiling or other surface, taking advantage of the Coandă effect
- To create low-velocity air movement in the occupied portion of room
- Accomplish the above while producing the minimum amount of noise

Dampers, extractors, and other flow control devices are not typically placed near diffusers' inlets (necks) as such devices have been shown to dramatically increase system noise. For as-cataloged diffuser performance, a straight section of duct is recommended serve a diffuser. An elbow, or kinked flex duct, just before a diffuser often leads to poor air distribution and increased noise.

Diffusers are typically round or rectangular. Narrow rectangular linear slot diffusers take the form of one or several long, narrow slots, mostly semi-concealed in a fixed or suspended ceiling with airfoils behind the slots directing the airflow in the desired direction.

Occasionally, diffusers are used in reverse as air inlets or returns, linear slot diffuser and 'perf' diffusers in particular. More commonly, grilles are used as return or exhaust air inlets.

== See also ==
- Bernoulli's principle
- Compressible flow
- Duct (flow)
- Mass flow rate
- Air conditioning
- ASHRAE
- SMACNA
- Nozzle
