= Room air distribution =

Air movement to, within, and from indoor spaces

Room air distribution is characterizing how air is introduced to, flows through, and is removed from spaces. HVAC airflow in spaces generally can be classified by two different types: mixing (or dilution) and displacement.

== Mixing systems ==
Mixing systems generally supply air such that the supply air mixes with the room air so that the mixed air is at the room design temperature and humidity. In cooling mode, the cool supply air, typically around 55 °F (13 °C) (saturated) at design conditions, exits an outlet at high velocity. The high-velocity supply air stream causes turbulence causing the room air to mix with the supply air. Because the entire room is near-fully mixed, temperature variations are small while the contaminant concentration is fairly uniform throughout the entire room. Diffusers are normally used as the air outlets to create the high-velocity supply air stream. Most often, the air outlets and inlets are placed in the ceiling. Supply diffusers in the ceiling are fed by fan coil units in the ceiling void or by air handling units in a remote plant room. The fan coil or handling unit takes in return air from the ceiling void and mix this with fresh air and cool, or heat it, as required to achieve the room design conditions. This arrangement is known as 'conventional room air distribution'.

=== Outlet types ===
- Group A1: In or near the ceiling that discharge air horizontally
- Group A2: Discharging horizontally that are not influenced by an adjacent surface
- Group B: In or near the floor that discharge air vertically in a linear jet
- Group C: In or near the floor that discharge air vertically in a spreading jet
- Group D: In or near the floor that discharge air horizontally
- Group E: Project supply air vertically downward

== Displacement ventilation ==
Displacement ventilation systems supply air directly to the occupied zone. The air is supplied at low velocities to cause minimal induction and mixing. This system is used for ventilation and cooling of large high spaces, such as auditorium and atria, where energy may be saved if only the occupied zone is treated rather than trying to control the conditions in the entire space.

Displacement room airflow presents an opportunity to improve both the thermal comfort and indoor air quality (IAQ) of the occupied space. It also takes advantage of the difference in air density between an upper contaminated zone and a lower clean zone. Cool air is supplied at low velocity into the lower zone. Convection from heat sources creates vertical air motion into the upper zone where high-level return inlets extract the air. In most cases these convection heat sources are also the contamination sources (e.g., people, equipment, or processes), thereby carrying the contaminants up to the upper zone, away from the occupants.

The displacement outlets are usually located at or near the floor with the air supply designed so the air flows smoothly across the floor. Where there is a heat source (such as people, lighting, computers, electrical equipment, etc.) the air will rise, pulling the cool supply air up with it and moving contaminants and heat from the occupied zone to the return or exhaust grilles above. By doing so, the air quality in the occupied zone is generally superior to that achieved with mixing room air distribution.

Since the conditioned air is supplied directly into the occupied space, supply air temperatures must be higher than mixing systems (usually above 63 °F or 17 °C) to avoid cold draughts at the floor. By introducing the air at supply air temperatures close to the room temperature and low outlet velocity a high level of thermal comfort can be provided with displacement ventilation.

== See also ==
- Dilution (equation)
- Duct (HVAC)
- HVAC
- Underfloor air distribution
- Indoor air quality
- Thermal comfort
- Air conditioning
- ASHRAE
- SMACNA
