= Smoke damper =

Fire protection products

Smoke dampers are passive fire protection products used in air conditioning and ventilation ductwork or installed in physical smoke barriers (e.g., walls).

== Use ==
Smoke damper may be used to prevent the spread of smoke from the space of fire origin to other spaces in the same building. A combination of fans and dampers can exhaust smoke from an area while pressurizing the smoke-free areas around the affected area (inhibiting smoke infiltration into additional areas). It may also be used to maintain the required concentration of a fire suppression clean agent in a space, as installed in supply air ducts to restrict the introduction of air into the space, and as installed in return or exhaust air ducts to restrict the depletion of the clean agent from the space. Smoke dampers are usually installed by sheet metal contractors.

Smoke dampers can be activated by the fire alarm system, usually initiated by smoke detectors, or interlocked with a fire suppression system. Smoke dampers close by an electric or pneumatic actuator, or a spring actuator, and can be either manually reset or driven open on a reset signal to the electric or pneumatic actuator.

Combination fire/smoke dampers are also available if a smoke barrier is desired at the same location as a fire barrier.

Fire dampers and smoke dampers are an integral and essential part of a building's passive fire protection system.

=== Inspection and maintenance ===
As with any other element of a building's passive fire protection system, smoke dampers need to be maintained, inspected and repaired to ensure they are in working order. The National Fire Protection Association (NFPA) requires the testing, maintenance and repair of smoke dampers as mandated in the Life Safety Code. NFPA 105 states [that] each damper shall be tested and inspected one year after installation. The test and inspection frequency shall then be every 4 years, except in hospitals, where the frequency shall be every 6 years. The code also states that the damper shall be actuated and cycled. The inspections must be document indicating the location of the damper, date of inspection, name of inspector, and deficiencies discovered.

As with fire damper inspections, smoke damper inspections are required by Authorities Having Jurisdiction (AHJ's). The International Code Council, the Joint Commission, NFPA and State Fire Marshals require these inspections as part of a Building's Life Safety Plan.

=== Repair ===
NFPA 105 requires that "if a damper is not operable, repairs shall begin as soon as possible". The repair of smoke dampers is more complicated as compared to fire dampers due to actuator replacement.

== Certification ==
According to Underwriter's Laboratory, "smoke dampers certified by UL carry a leakage class rating that indicates the level of air leakage measured through the damper under test conditions."
