= Sheet Metal and Air Conditioning Contractors' National Association =

International trade association

The Sheet Metal and Air Conditioning Contractors' National Association (SMACNA; pronounced 'Smack'-'Nah') is an international trade association with more than 4,500 contributing contractor members in 103 chapters throughout the United States, Canada, Australia and Brazil. Its headquarters is in Chantilly, Virginia.

== Member profile ==
SMACNA members perform work in industrial, commercial, institutional and residential markets. They specialize in heating, ventilation and air conditioning (HVAC); architectural sheet metal; industrial sheet metal; kitchen equipment; specialty stainless steel work; manufacturing; siding and decking; testing and balancing; service; and energy management and maintenance.

== Technical manuals and standards ==
The voluntary technical standards and manuals developed by SMACNA Contractors have found worldwide acceptance by the construction and design community, as well as local, national, and foreign government agencies. ANSI, the American National Standards Institute, has accredited SMACNA as a standards-setting organization. SMACNA does not seek to enforce its standards or provide accreditation for compliance.

SMACNA standards and manuals address all facets of the sheet metal industry, from duct construction and installation to indoor air quality and air pollution control, from energy recovery to roofing. SMACNA's Technical Resources Department fields several thousand technical questions annually from architects, engineers, manufacturers and government personnel.

== Member services ==
The association offers contractors professional assistance in labor relations, legislative assistance, research and technical standards development, safety, marketing, business management and industry issues.

== See also ==
- American Society of Heating, Refrigerating and Air-Conditioning Engineers
- Sheet Metal Workers' International Association
- Sheet metal
- Duct (flow)
- Pressurisation ductwork
- Smoke exhaust ductwork
- Duct (industrial exhaust)
- HVAC
- Air conditioning
- Uniform Mechanical Code
