= Turning vanes =

Component of HVAC systems

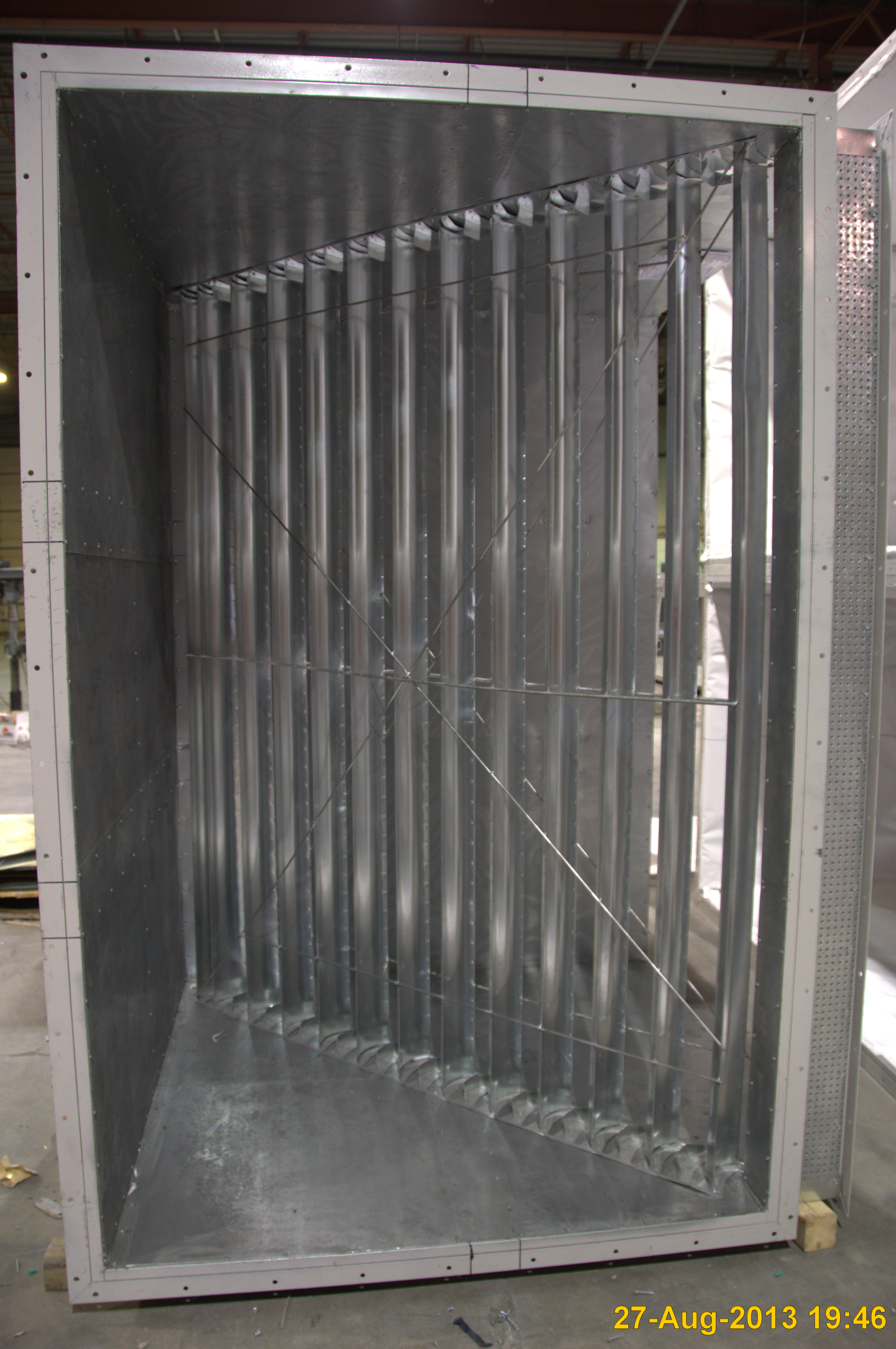
Turning vanes inside of large ductwork

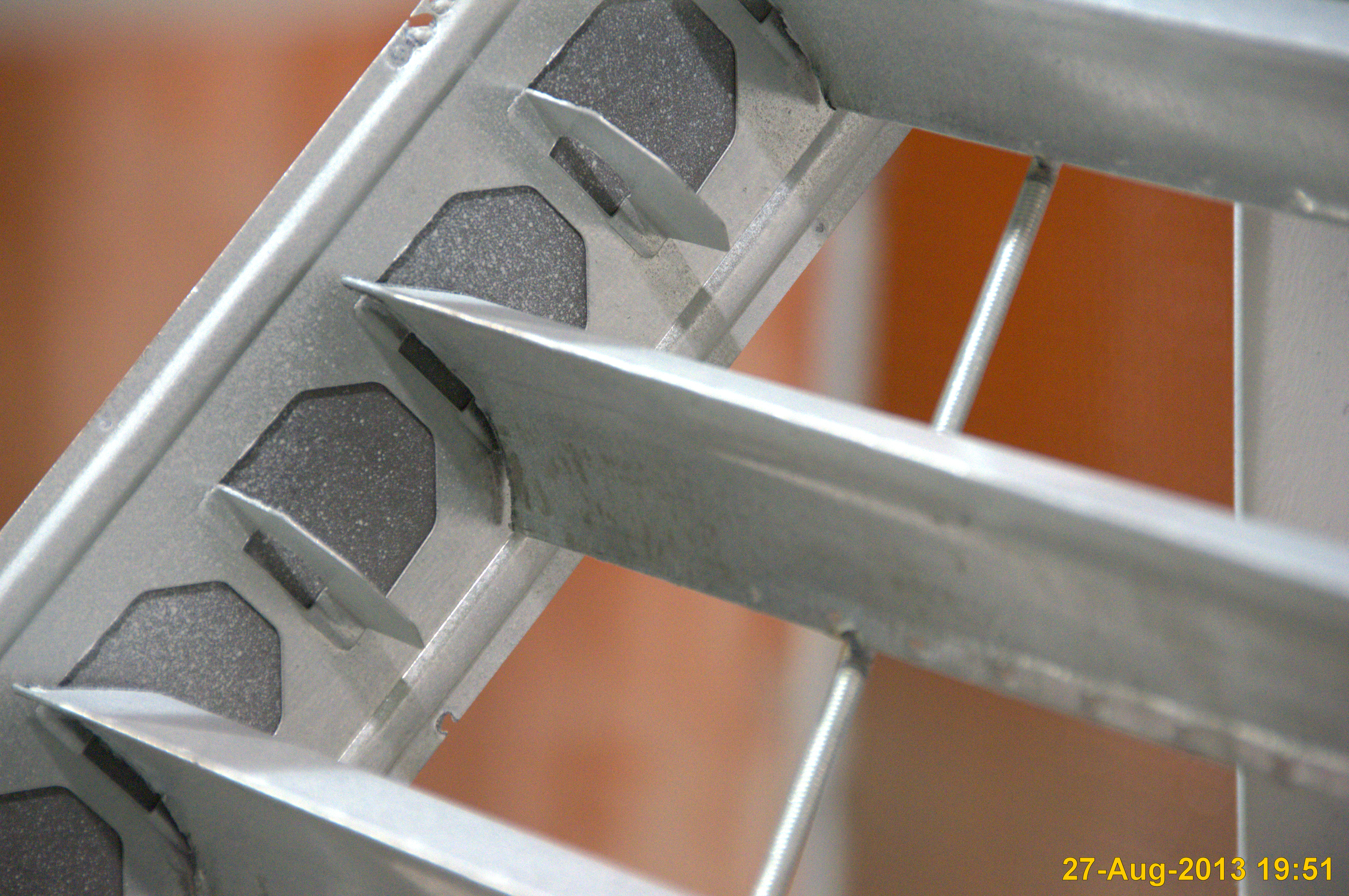
Turning vane close-up

HVAC turning vanes are sheet metal devices inside of mechanical ductwork used to smoothly direct air inside a duct where there is a change in direction, by reducing resistance and turbulence.

== See also ==
- Duct (HVAC)
- Pressurisation ductwork
