= Smoke exhaust ductwork =

Ventilation designed to remove smoke

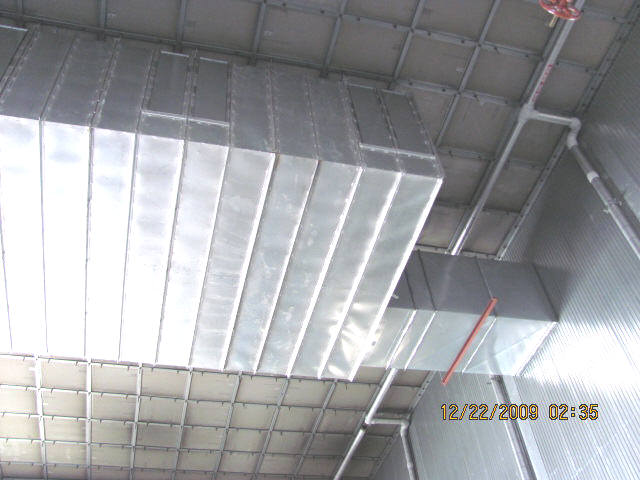
Smoke exhaust duct used to extract smoke generated during fire testing at National Research Council (Canada)'s National Fire Laboratory in Mississippi Mills, Ontario

Smoke exhaust ductwork, in Europe, is typically protected via passive fire protection means, subject to fire testing (typically to NBN EN 1366-8) and listing and approval use and compliance. It is used to remove smoke from buildings, ships or offshore structures to enable emergency evacuation as well as improved firefighting. In North America, fireproofed ductwork may be used for the purpose of smoke exhaust, but it is more common to use unfireproofed return air ductwork, whereby no fire testing or listings are employed to qualify the ductwork for this use.

== Means of construction ==
Smoke exhaust can be built using:

- ordinary sheet metal with external fireproofing treatment; or
- a proprietary duct that is inherently fire-resistant; or
- Fire resistant materials, such as calcium silicate.

== Gallery ==
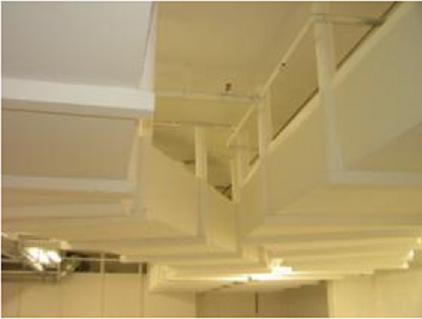

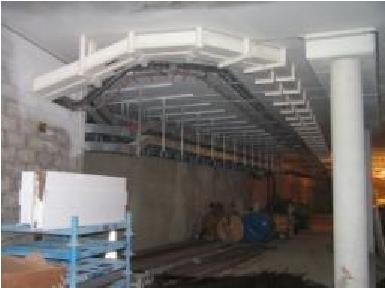

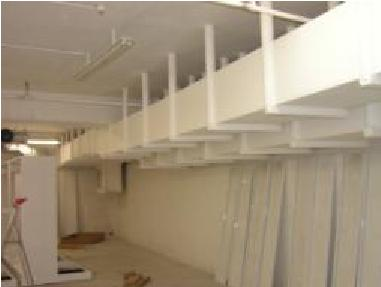

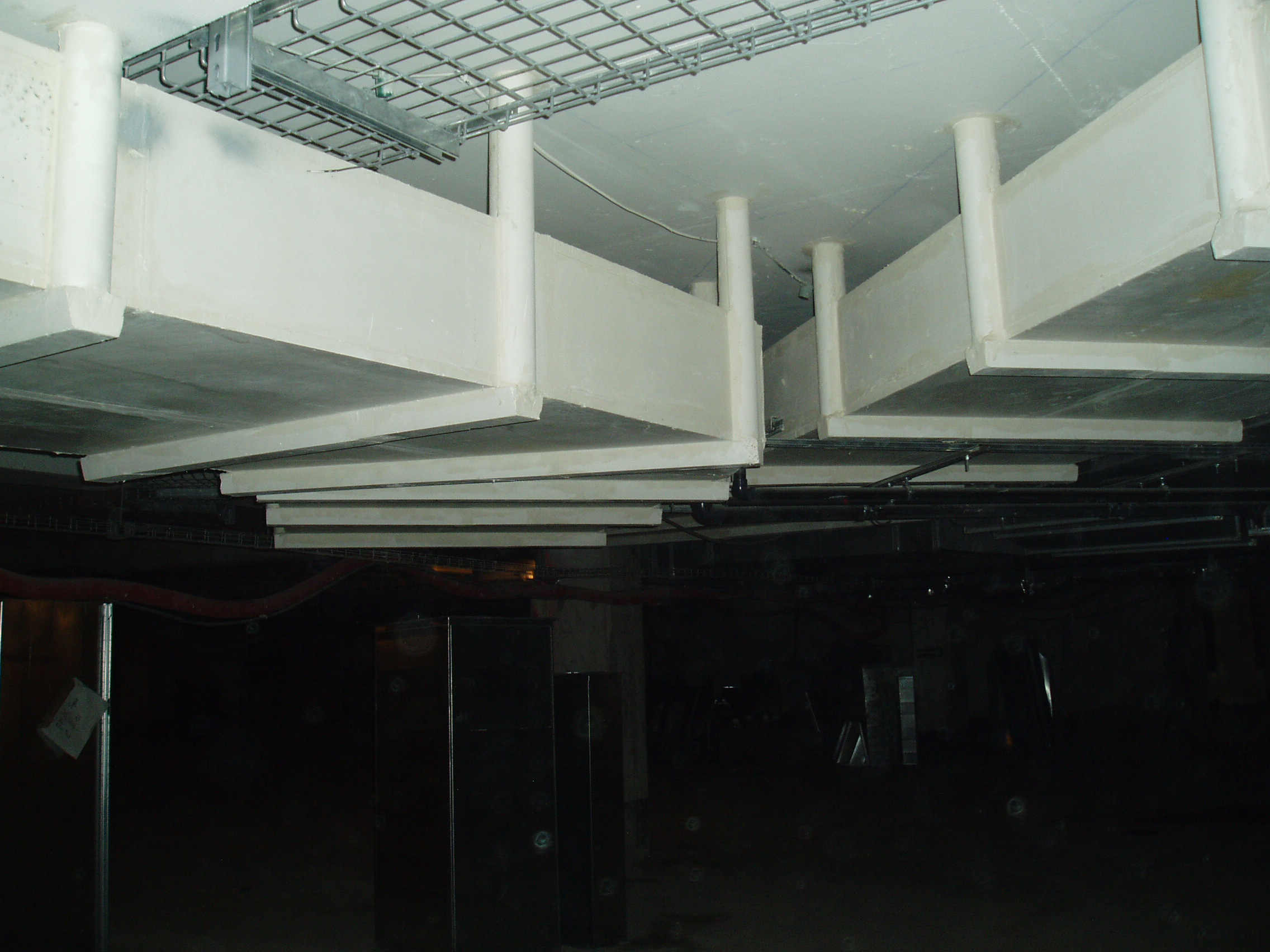

== See also ==
- Passive fire protection
- Pressurisation ductwork
- Heat and smoke vent
- Grease duct
- Calcium silicate
- Fireproofing
- Firestop
- HVAC
- Listing and approval use and compliance
- Smoke
- Fire
- Emergency evacuation
