= Pressurisation ductwork =

Passive fire protection system

Pressurisation ductwork (sheet metal) externally fireproofed with pressed vermiculite boards, stapled together.

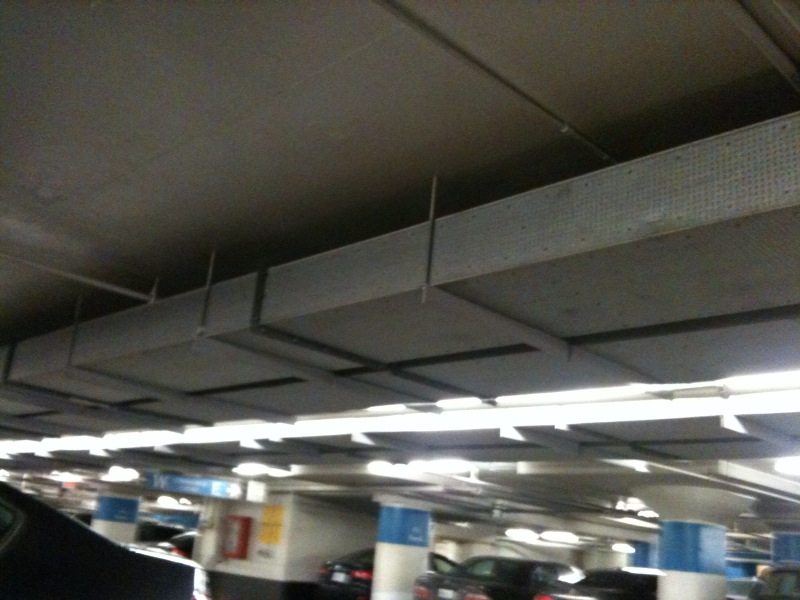
Pressurisation ductwork made of Durasteel

Pressurisation ductwork is a passive fire protection system. It is used to supply fresh air to any area of refuge, designated emergency evacuation or egress route.

== Purpose ==
The purpose of pressurisation ductwork is to maintain positive pressure in building spaces to prevent smoke from entering from other spaces in which a fire is occurring. It is typically used in exit stairways, corridors, and lobbies.

== Requirements ==
Pressurisation ductwork is certified on the basis of fire testing such as ISO 6944.

== Systems ==
There are two means of providing fire-resistance rated ductwork:

- Inherently fire-resistant, or proprietary factory assembled ducts which are made of sheet metal shells filled with mixtures of rockwool, fiber and silicon dioxide
- Sheet metal duct with exterior fireproofing materials such as blanket rockwool, ceramic fiber, or intumescent paint.

== See also ==
- Heat and smoke vent
- Fire protection
- Smoke exhaust ductwork
- Emergency evacuation
