= Packing (firestopping) =

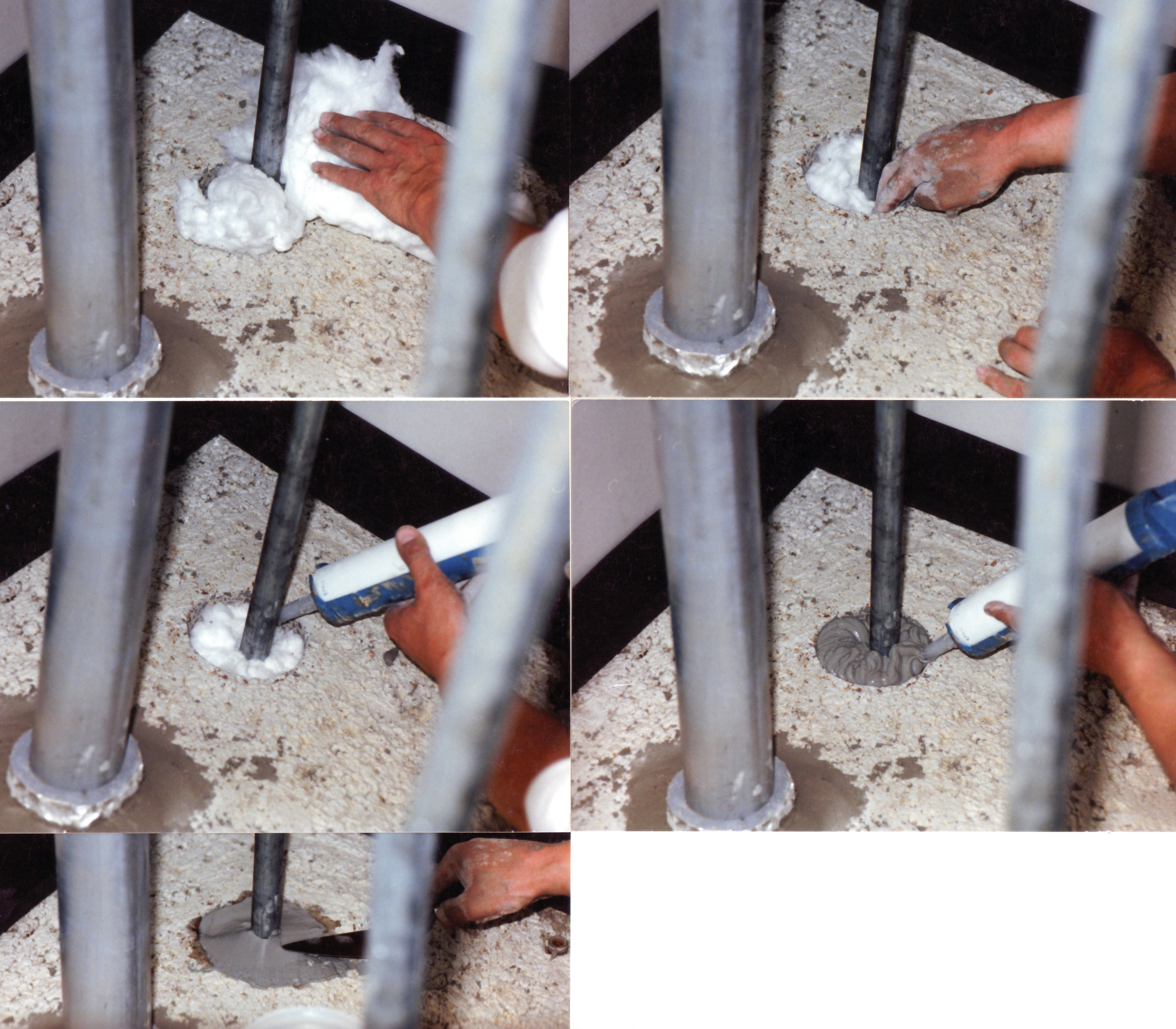
Ceramic fibre used as packing to support firestop silicone caulking

Packing is the process and/or the materials used in filling both service penetrations and building joints with backer materials as approved components within a firestop.

== Purpose ==
Packing with inherently fire-resistive materials, such as rockwool or ceramic fibre is intended to protect sealants that would, on their own, be consumed by the fire. Lesser packing, such as foam backer rod or fibreglass are used simply to hold up materials that can survive fire testing on their own. In both cases, the packing is placed in such a way as to control the exact depth of the materials that top off the seal.

== See also ==
- Firestop
- Mineral wool
- Annulus (firestop)
- Penetration (firestop)
- Fire test
- Passive fire protection
- Sealant
- Caulking
- Annulus (firestop)
