= Penetration (firestop) =

A penetration, in firestopping, is an opening, such as one created by the use of a cast-in-place sleeve, in a wall or floor assembly required to have a fire-resistance rating, for the purpose of accommodating the passage of a mechanical, electrical, or structural penetrant.

The penetration may or may not contain a firestop system. A penetration (opening) may or may not include a penetrant (something passing through the opening).

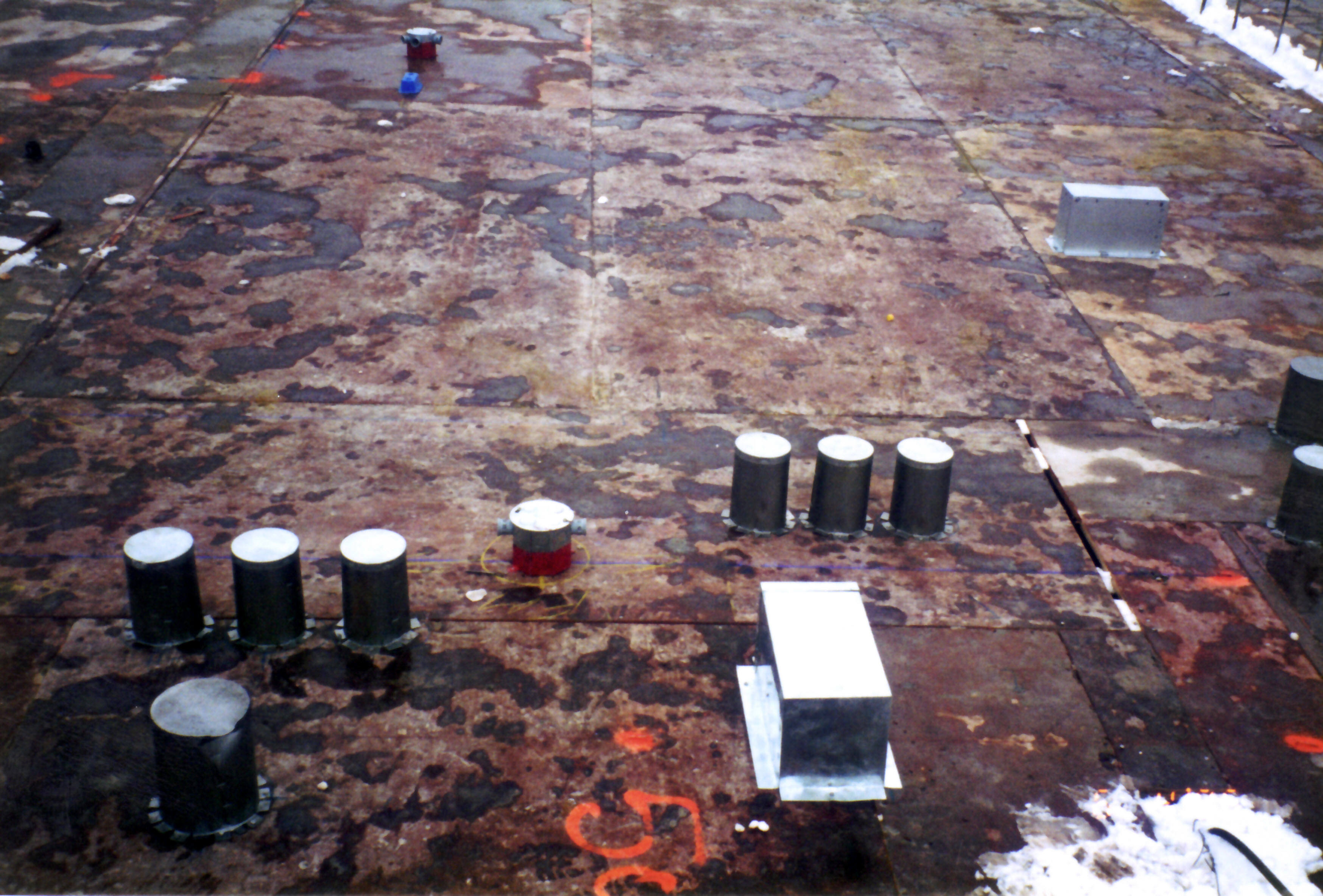
Sheet metal cans are nailed to form boards where concrete is about to be cast. The cans are located by the plumber. Once the penetrants are in place, one can firestop.

A penetration, in this case without a firestop.

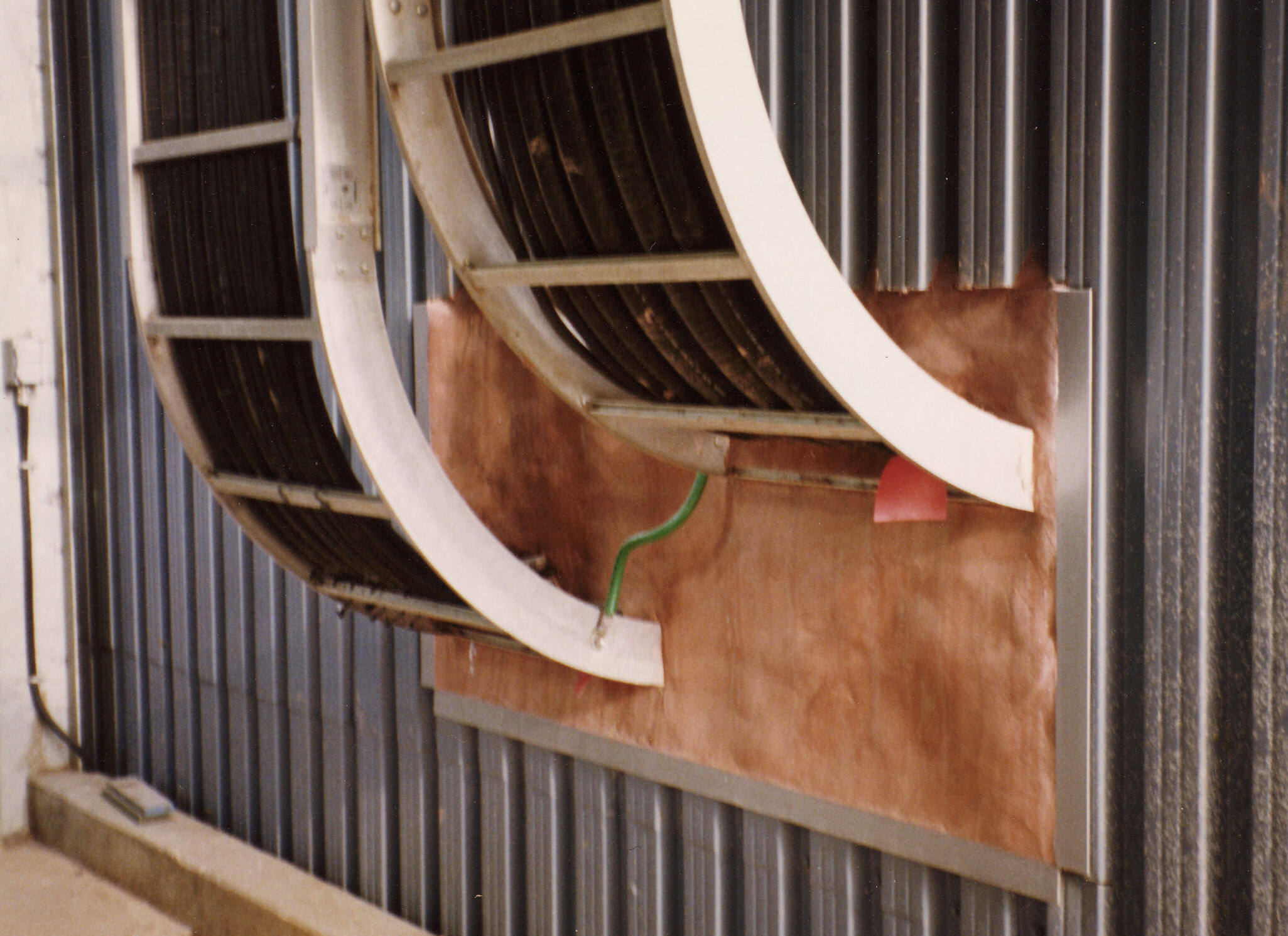
A firestopped penetration

== See also ==
- Sleeve (construction)
- Passive fire protection
- Annulus (firestop)
- Joint (building)
- Penetrant (mechanical, electrical, or structural)
- Mortar (firestop)
- Firestop pillow
- Fire test
