= Sleeve (construction) =

Pipe or cable connector

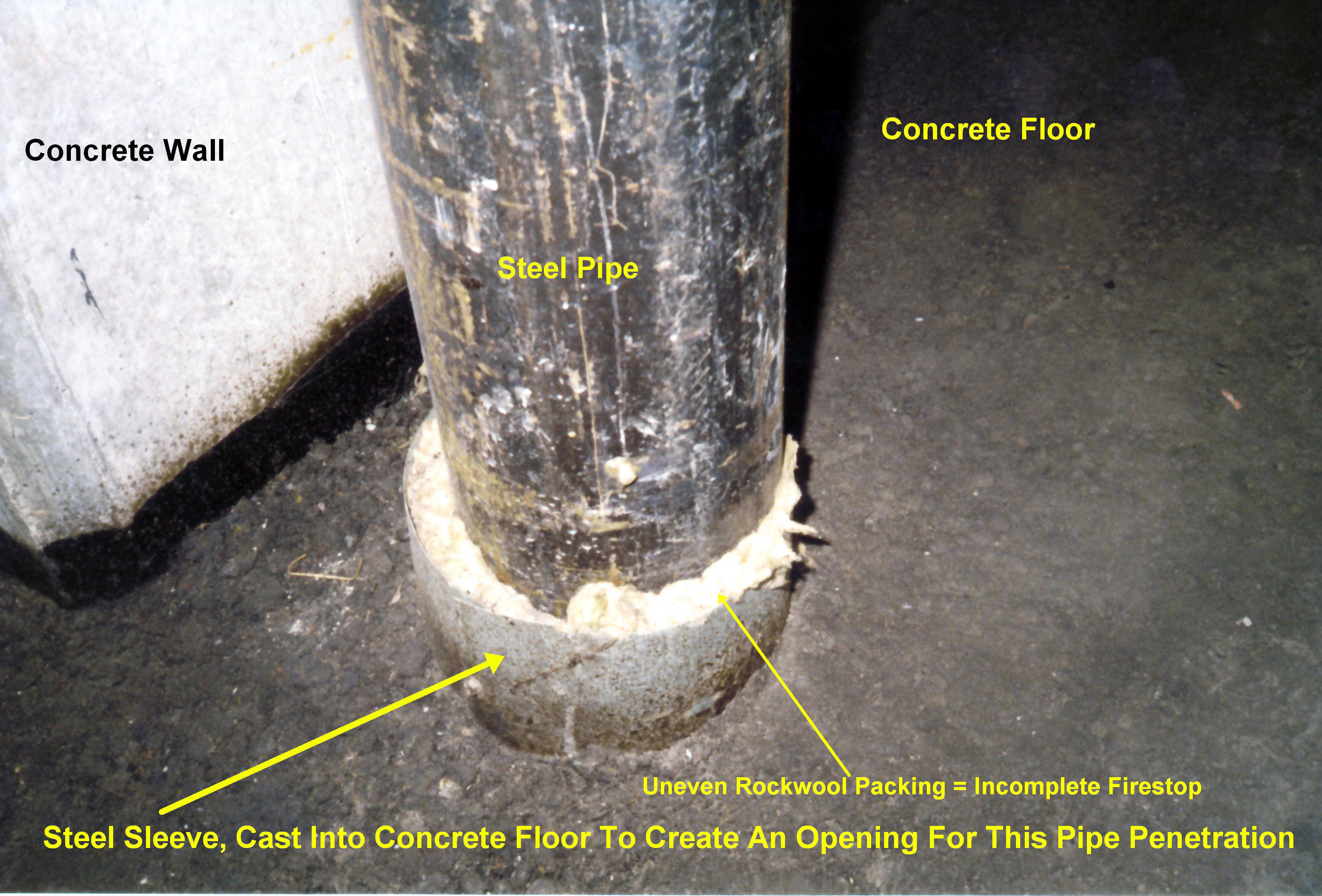
Steel sleeve used to create a pipe penetration, with uneven rockwool packing, making an incomplete firestop.

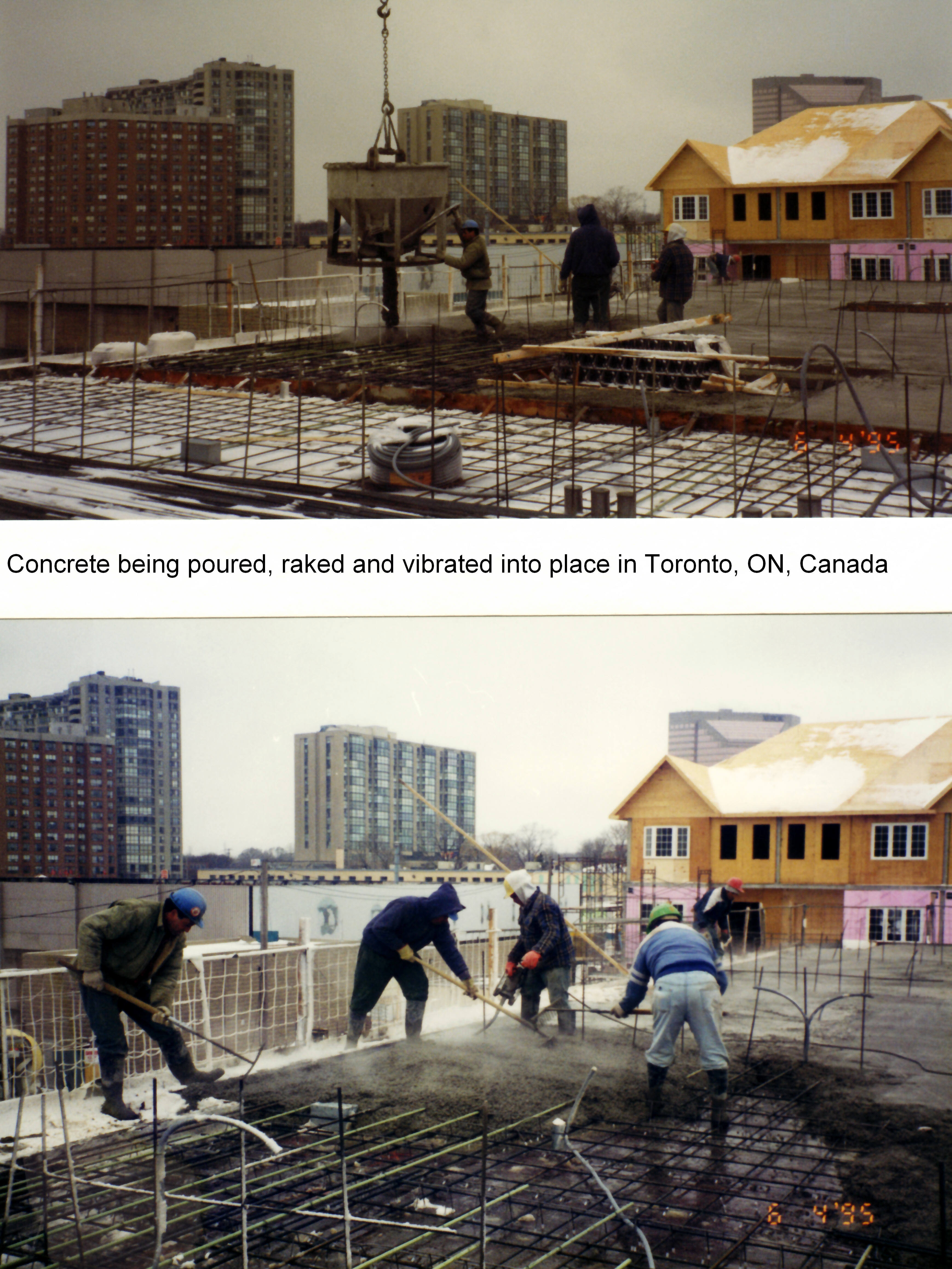
Notice the sleeves, fastened to the timber forms before the concrete is cast.

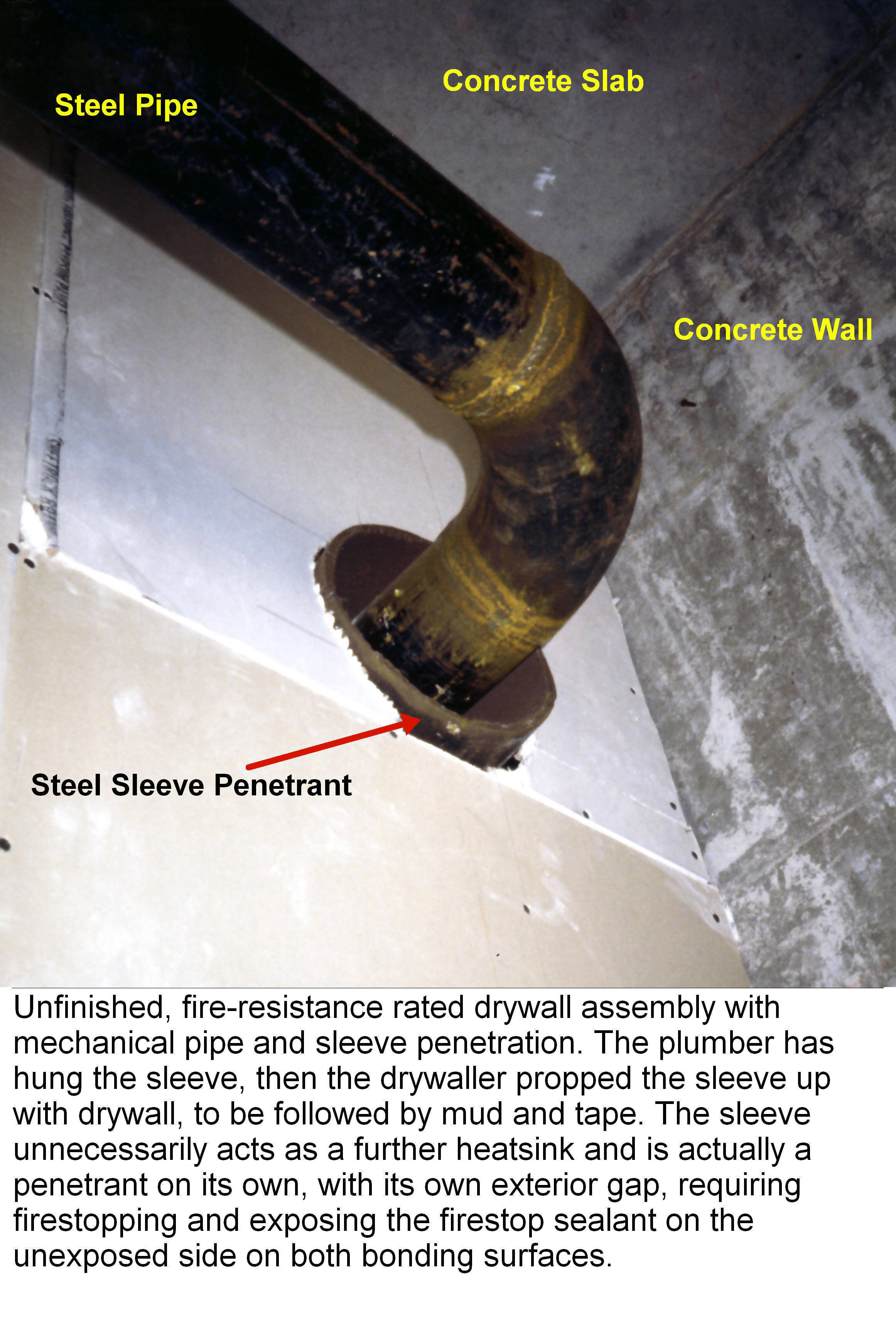
improper sleeving in a drywall assembly.

In construction, a sleeve is used both by the electrical and mechanical trades to create a penetration in a solid wall, ceiling or floor.

== Purpose ==
- For cables we provide wall/deck penetration sleeve to avoid any damage to cable from material shifting on deck.
- Deck penetrations on offshore platform provided to avoid water/chemical dripping to lower deck in case of spillage.
- Acts as toe guard.
- For wall penetrations it can be a type of strengthening.
- Together with packing it helps to protect from fire spread from one room to other.

== Materials ==
Sleeves can be made of:

- sections of steel pipe.
- plastic.
- sheet metal.
- proprietary devices that are listed firestop components.

== Requirements ==
- Sleeves must be sized such as to adequately allow the passage of the intended penetrant(s) plus enough room to permit the practical installation and mounting of the penetrants as well as adequate room for firestops. A general practice is to size the sleeve two NPS (pipe sizes) up from the diameter of the penetrant. For example, a 4" pipe, with 1" of thermal insulation makes a 6" penetrant (1" pipe covering on each side of the pipe), plus two pipe sizes = an 8" sleeve, creating a 1" annulus.
- In case of insulated piping, the size of the insulation must be taken into account for the intended firestop certification listing.

== Hazards ==
- Metallic sleeves are heatsinks in the firestop that follows the mounting of the penetrants. Maximum and minimum tolerances for wall thicknesses must be taken into account prior to casting. Heatsinks can affect T-ratings. Organic sealants used for topcaulking in firestops may let go of the sleeve if it has conducted too much heat through to the unexposed side (as in the case of the fire test article, this picture).
- Plastic sleeves are usually removed after the concrete forms are stripped, as they contribute fuel to an accidental fire.

== See also ==
- Piping
- Firestop
- Packing (firestopping)
- Penetration (firestop)
- Penetrant (mechanical, electrical, or structural)
- Annulus (firestop)
- Fire-resistance rating
- Fire test
- Heat sink
