= Joint (building) =

Junction where building elements meet without applying loads to one another

A building joint is a junction where building elements meet without applying a static load from one element to another. When one or more of these vertical or horizontal elements that meet are required by the local building code to have a fire-resistance rating, the resulting opening that makes up the joint must be firestopped in order to restore the required compartmentalisation.

== Qualification requirements ==
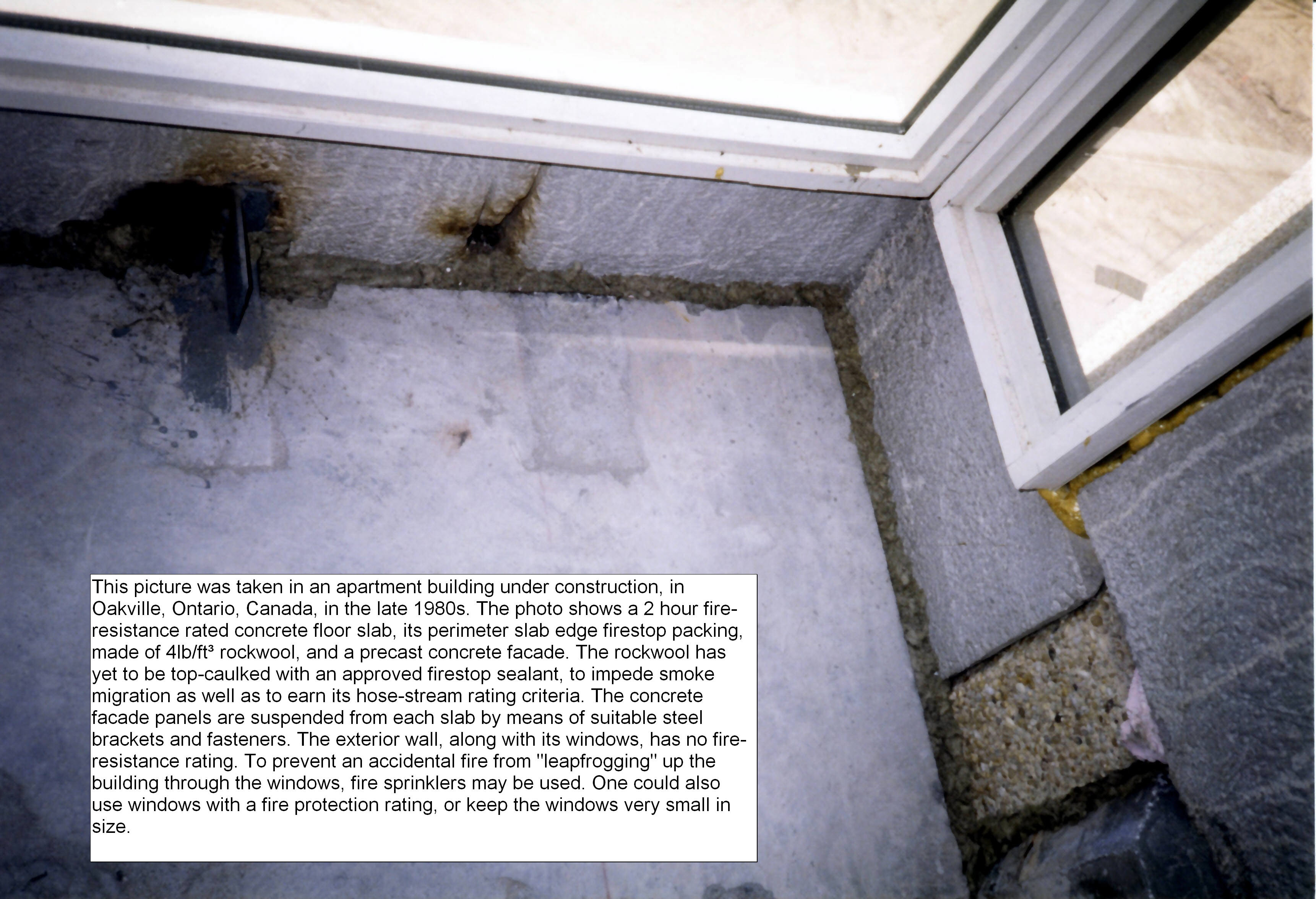
Perimeter slab edge building joint with incomplete firestop, between concrete floor and precast concrete facade.

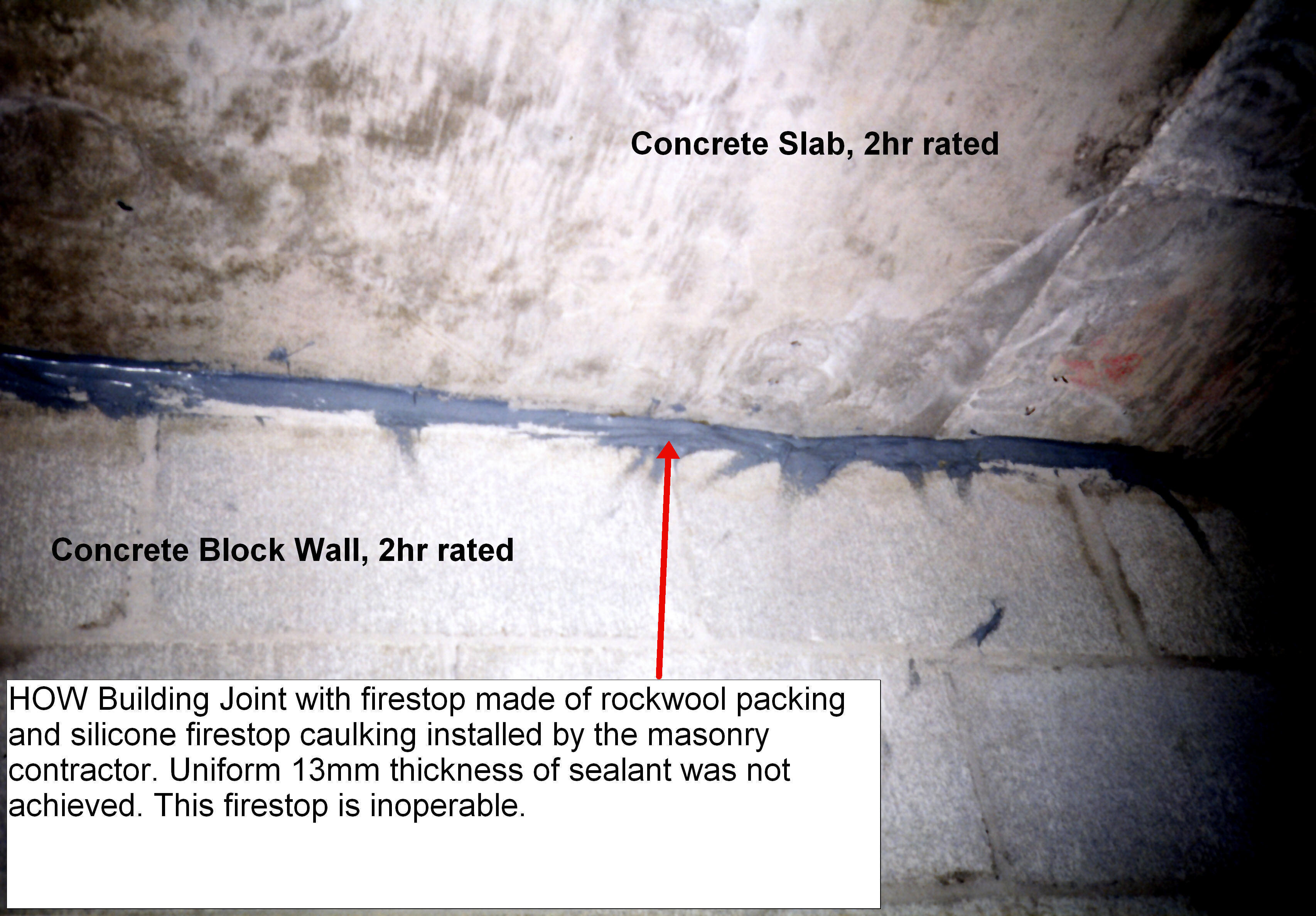
HOW Joint with uneven silicone caulking thickness. Status: inoperable.

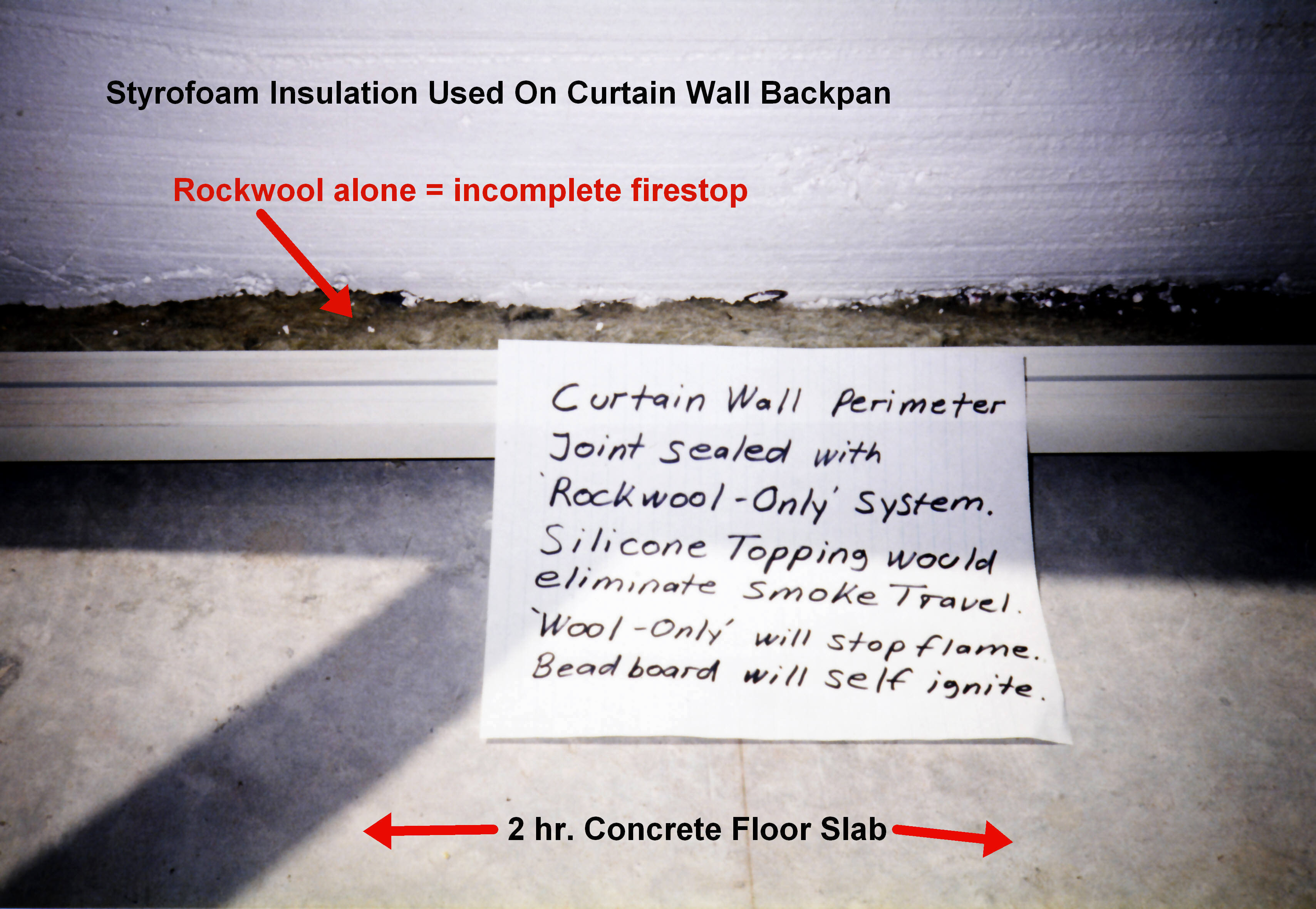
Combustible Polystyrene insulation in point contact with sheet metal curtain wall backban. Incomplete firestop made of rockwool without topcaulking.

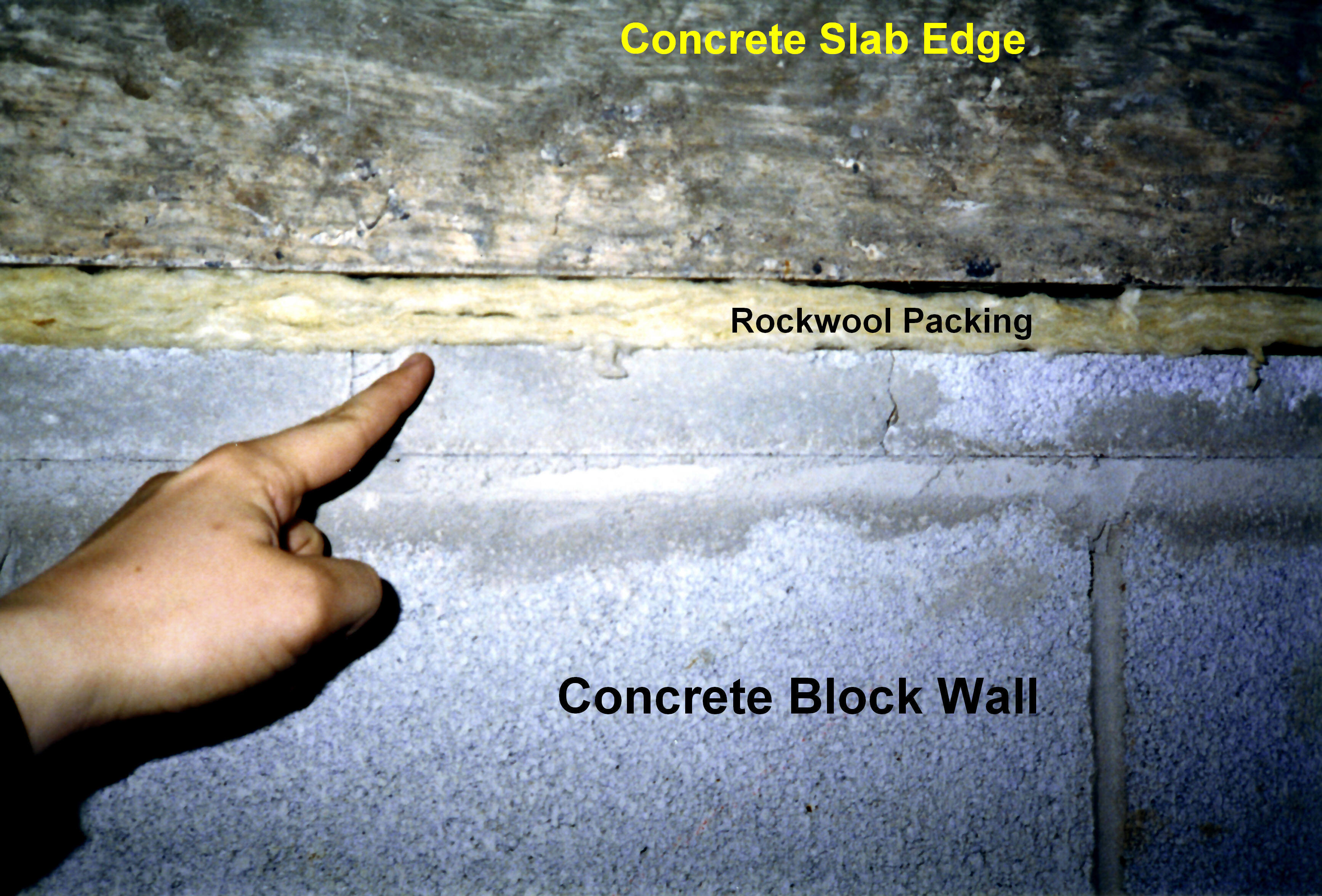
"HOW" (Head Of Wall) Building Joint with incomplete firestop made of rockwool packing

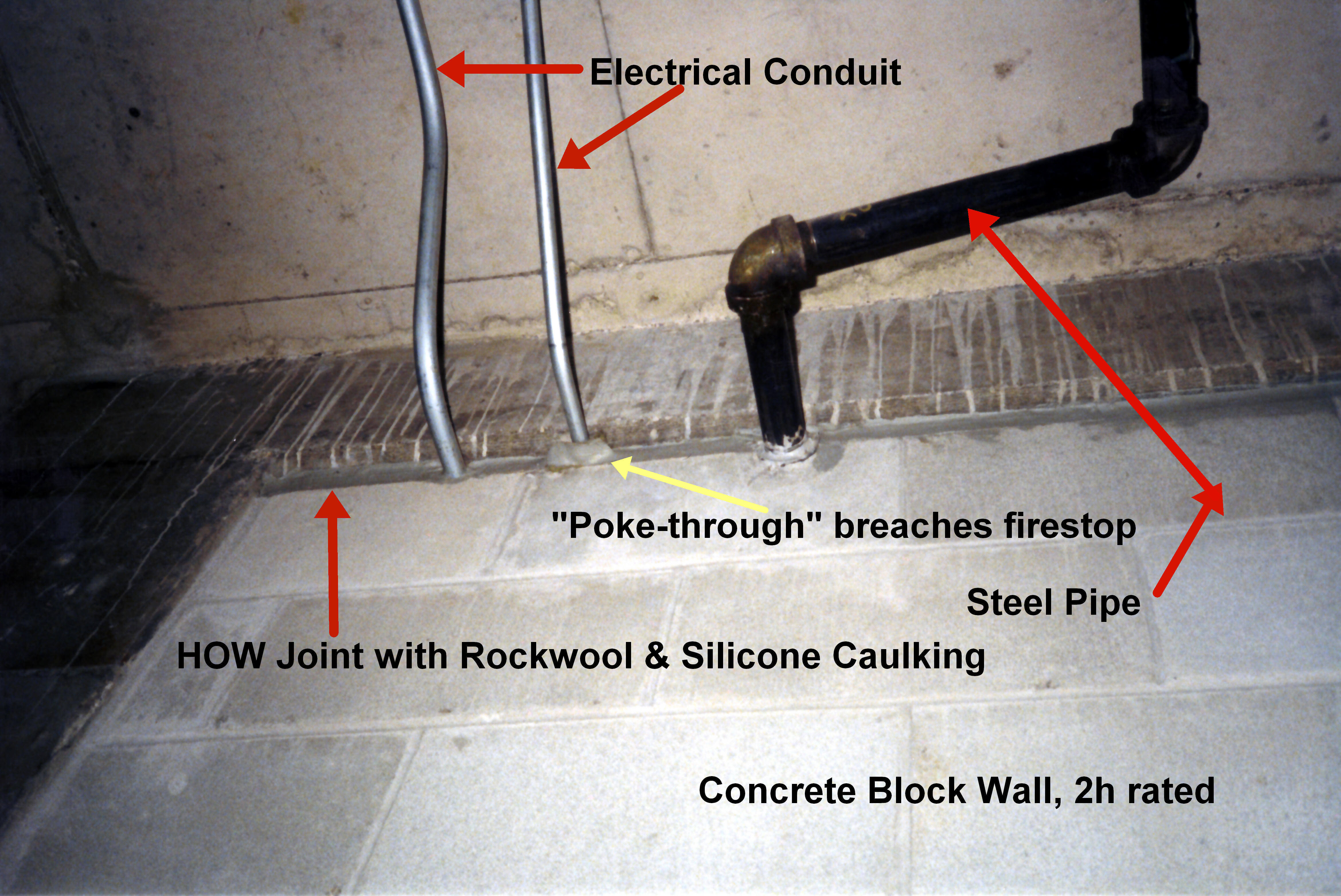
HOW joint penetrated by both mechanical and electrical penetrants,

Such joints are often subject to movement. Firestops must be able to demonstrate the ability to withstand operational movement prior to fire testing. Firestops for such building joints can be qualified to UL 2079 -- Tests for Fire Resistance of Building Joint Systems.

The joint design must consider the anticipated operational movement of each joint. Timing is also important, as freshly poured concrete shrinks particularly during the first few months of a new building, potentially causing joint size changes.

== Head-of-Wall (HOW) ==
Where vertical fire-resistance rated wall assemblies meet the underside of the floor slab above, a movement joint results, which can be subject to compression, as the freshly placed concrete cures and shrinks all over a new building. This joint must be firestopped in a flexible manner.

== See also ==
- Concrete
- Penetration (firestop)
- Sealant
- Firestop
- Curtain wall
- Passive fire protection
- Active fire protection
- Mineral wool
- Packing (firestopping)
- Fire sprinkler
- Articulation
