= Intumescent =

Substance that swells as a result of heat exposure

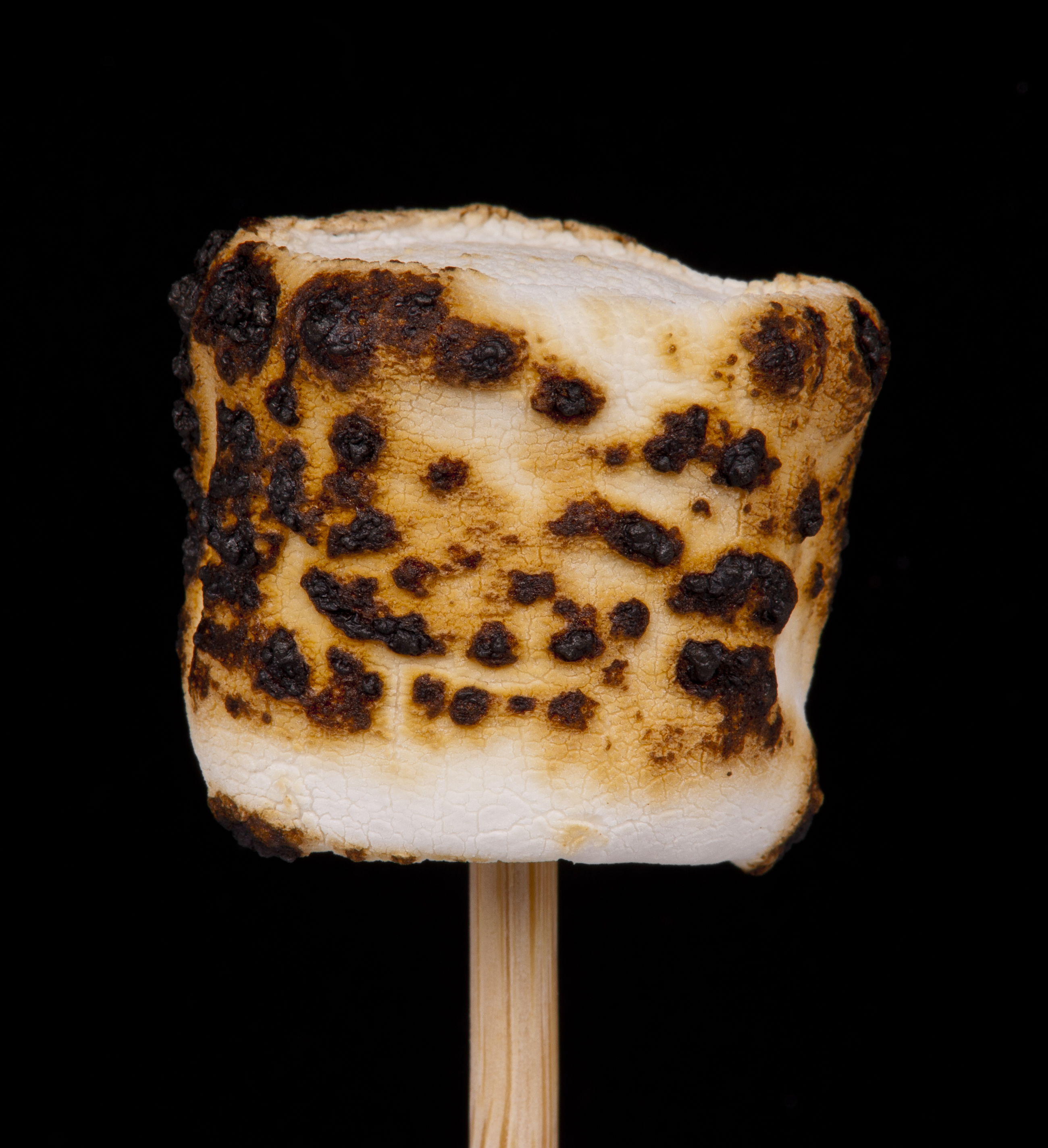
A charred marshmallow is a familiar example of intumescence

An intumescent substance is one that swells as a result of heat exposure, leading to an increase in volume and decrease in density. Intumescence refers to the process of swelling. Intumescent materials are typically used in passive fire protection and require listing, approval, and compliance in their installed configurations in order to comply with the national building codes and laws.

The details for individual building parts are specified in technical standards which are compiled and published by national or international standardization bodies like the British Standards Institute (BSI), the German Institute for Standardization (DIN), the American Society for Testing and Materials (ASTM) or the International Organization for Standardization (ISO).

Intumescent coatings for steel constructions must be approved in standardized fire tests.

== Types ==
=== Soft char ===
These intumescent materials produce a light char which is a poor conductor of heat, thus retarding heat transfer. Typically the light char consists of microporous carbonaceous foam formed by a chemical reaction of three main components: ammonium polyphosphate, pentaerythritol, and melamine. The reaction takes place in a matrix formed by the molten binder which is typically based on vinyl acetate copolymers or styrene acrylates.

Ablative coatings contain a significant amount of hydrates. When the hydrates are heated, they decompose, and water vapour is released, which has a cooling effect. Once the water is spent, the insulation characteristics of the char that remains can retard heat transfer through the fire stop assembly.

Soft char products are typically used in thin film intumescent materials for fireproofing protection of structural steel as well as in firestop pillows.

=== Hard char ===
Harder char is produced with sodium silicates and graphite. These products are suitable for use in plastic pipe firestops in which applications it is necessary to exert expansion pressure to fill the gap left in the middle of the fire stop assembly left by the melting plastic pipe.

=== Intumescent coatings ===
Intumescent coatings may be designed for protection of metals from fire, such as structural steel. They may be based on a number of resin binders including epoxy, and silicone. Melamine-formaldehyde resin systems have been used using layered double-hydroxide modified phosphate esters that improved the intumescent properties.

== Problems ==
Some intumescent materials are susceptible to environmental influences such as humidity, which can reduce or negate their ability to function.

== Gallery ==
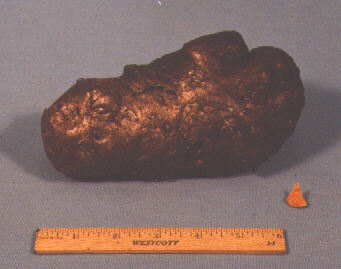
Low pressure intumescent resin: This product is suitable for use in passive fire protection in general, and in firestopping and interior fireproofing in particular. The small, orange chunk on the bottom right is capable of growing into the large black object above and to its left.

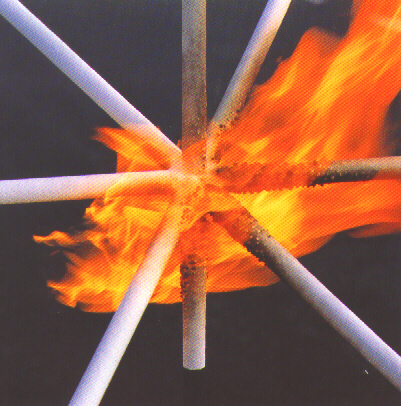
Pipe covered with a thin-film intumescent spray fireproofing

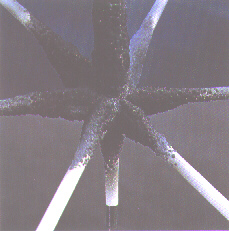
In this picture, the flame has been removed after the thin-film intumescent spray fireproofing product has completely expanded.

Intumescent gasketing used in passive fire protection, for fire door applications.

== See also ==
- Fire test
- Fire-resistance rating
- Hydrate
- Fire protection
- Passive fire protection
- Firestops
- Putty
- Fireproofing
- Firestop pillow
- Endothermic
- Sodium silicate
- Graphite
- Penetrant (mechanical, electrical, or structural)
- Listing and approval use and compliance
- Construction
- Black snake (firework)
- Starlite
