= Caulk =

Flexible material used in construction to seal joints

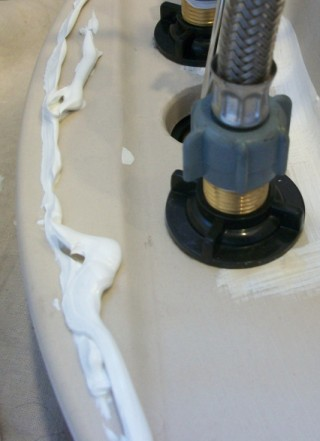
Silicone-based caulk on this upturned bathroom sink will spread smoothly, sealing the gap, when the sink is turned over and installed.

Caulk (also known as caulking and calking) is a material used to seal joints or seams against leakage in various structures and piping. The same word is also the verb for the action of applying such sealing material.

The oldest form of caulk consisted of fibrous materials driven into the wedge-shaped seams between boards on wooden boats or ships. Cast iron sewerage pipes were formerly caulked in a similar way. Riveted seams in ships and boilers were formerly sealed by hammering the metal.

Modern caulking compounds are flexible sealing compounds used to close up gaps in buildings and other structures against water, air, dust, and insects, or as a component in firestopping. In the tunneling industry, caulking is the sealing of joints in segmental precast concrete tunnels, commonly by using concrete.

== Historical uses ==
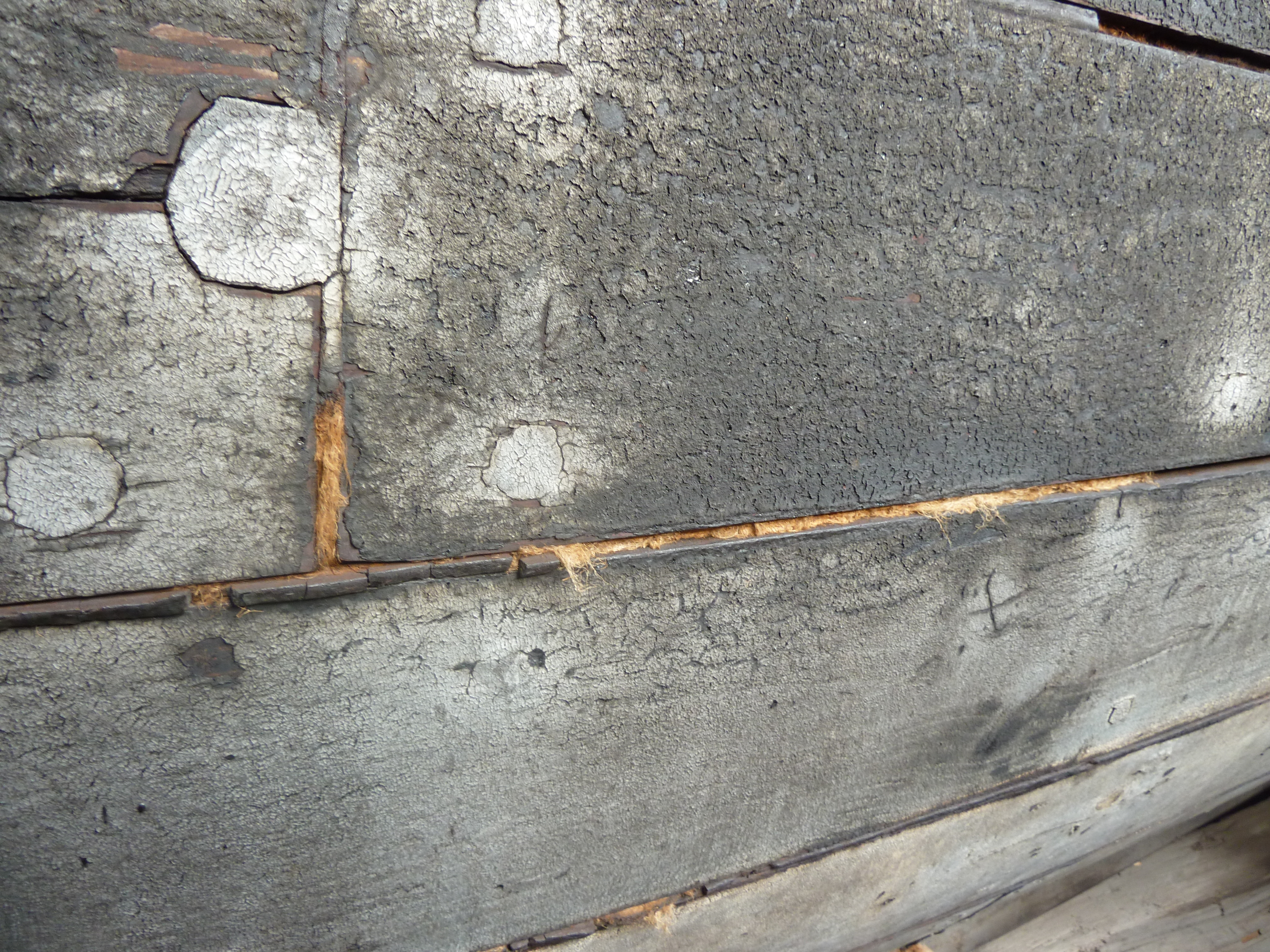
Dried-out caulking on the Severn trow Spry, now displayed on shore

Traditional caulking (also spelled calking) on wooden vessels uses fibers of cotton and oakum (hemp) soaked in pine tar. These fibers are driven into the wedge-shaped seam between planks, with a caulking mallet and a broad chisel-like tool called a caulking iron. The caulking is then covered over with a putty, in the case of hull seams, or else in deck seams with melted pine pitch, in a process referred to as paying, or "calefaction". Those who carried out this work were known as caulkers.

Henry Mayhew described the work done by caulkers in London on the hulls of wooden sailing ships in September 1850,

The caulkers’ work is especially hard, so much so that they do not toil later than three in the afternoon. The greater fatigue of the caulkers is attributable to their having to caulk in all positions of the body – recumbent or half-recumbent. When the bottom of the ship, for instance, the men have hardly room to stand.

In riveted steel or iron ship construction, caulking was a process of rendering seams watertight by driving a thick, blunt chisel-like tool into the plating adjacent to the seam. This displaced the metal into a close fit with the adjoining piece.

Caulking of iron and steel was also used by boilermakers in the era of riveted boilers to make the joints watertight and steamtight.

== Modern use in construction ==
=== Application ===
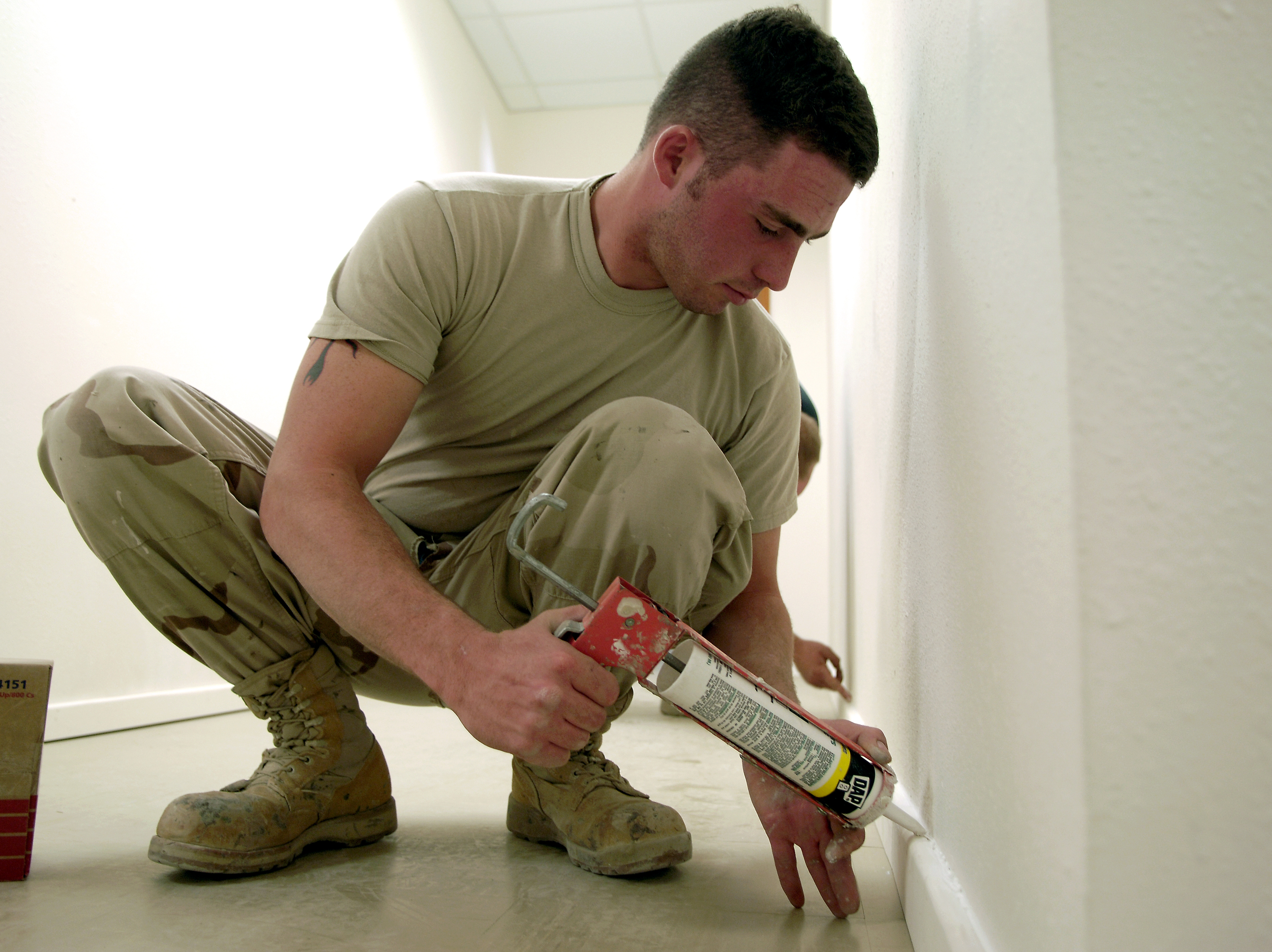
Man applying caulk to baseboard

For bulk use, caulk is generally distributed in disposable cartridges, which are rigid cylindrical cardboard or plastic tubes with an applicator tip at one end, and a movable plunger at the far end. These are used in caulking guns, which typically have a trigger connected to a rod which pushes the plunger, and has a ratchet to prevent backlash. The push rod may also be actuated by a motor or by compressed air. Similar mechanisms are used for grease guns.

For smaller applications, caulk may be distributed in squeeze tubes.

==== Backer rod ====
Backer rod, also called backer material or back-up rod, is a flexible foam product used behind caulking to increase elasticity, reduce consumption, force the caulking into contact with the sides of the joint creating a better bond, determine the thickness of the caulking, and define the cross-section hour-glass shape of the caulk. The backer rod also acts as a bond breaker to keep the caulking from sticking to the bottom of the opening—called a three-sided bond—with the caulk only adhering to the sides of the opening in an hour-glass shape it can flex more easily and is less likely to tear.

Closed-cell foam does not absorb water and is impermeable. Closed-cell rods are less compressible and should not be compressed more than 25%. Closed-cell rod will also lose firmness and out-gas if damaged during installation or overcompressed or at sharp bends. The gasses cannot pass through this backer rod and can deform, weaken, and even cause holes (leaks) in the caulk or sealant as it escapes.

Out-gassing is the reason that open-cell backer rod was developed. Open-cell foam is porous so it will let gasses through which could otherwise cause blistering of the caulk or sealant. Additionally, open-cell backer rod allows air to get to the back side of the caulk or sealant which accelerates curing when used with air-cured sealants such as silicone. Open-cell rod is more compressible than closed-cell foam and should be compressed 25% to 75%.

=== Energy efficiency ===
According to the Consumer Federation of America, sealing unwanted leaks around homes is an excellent way to cut home energy costs and decrease the household carbon footprint.

=== Preventing infestation ===
Sealing cracks and crevices prevents ingress by rodents.

== Types ==
=== Acrylic latex ===
The most common type of caulk is acrylic latex, for general-purpose use. Not only is acrylic latex inexpensive, but it is also the easiest type to apply smoothly and later paint if needed.

=== Acrylic tile sealant ===
Acrylic tile sealant usually comes in small tubes and is commonly used for wet applications.

=== Polyurethane ===
Polyurethane caulk is a very durable construction sealant. It has good adhesion towards concrete, wood, metals (steel, aluminium), plastic, masonry, etc. It is commonly used for sealing ventilation systems.

=== Silicone ===
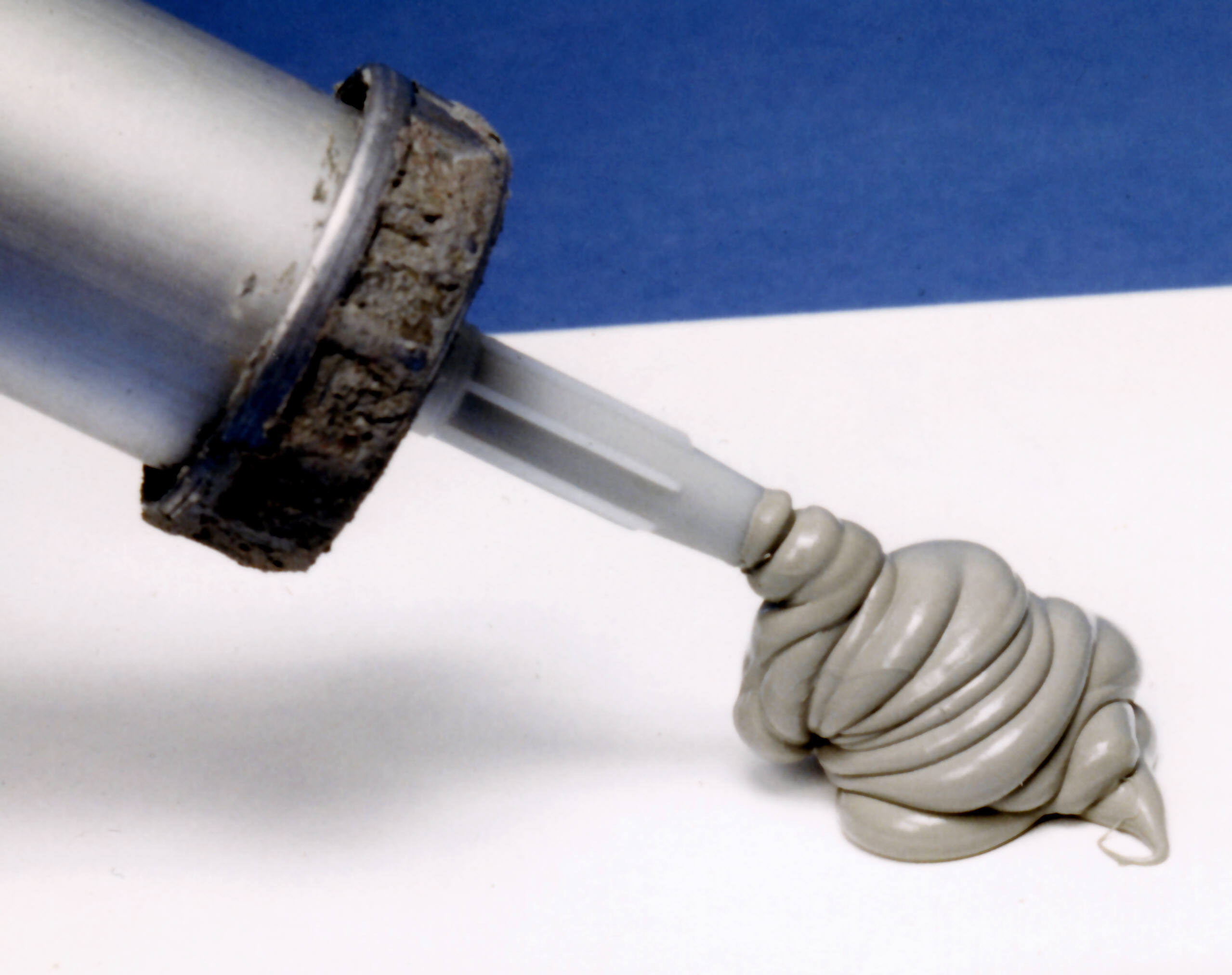
Silicone caulking extruded from a caulking gun

Silicone caulk or sealant is water-, mold-, and mildew-resistant. Technically, when a joint material is silicone-based, it is considered a sealant rather than caulk.

== See also ==
- Grout – Building material
