= Fire blocking =

Fire safety system in a wall or ceiling

Fire blocking or firestopping is a system of supplemental components in a wood-framed wall or ceiling, which prevents the rapid propagation of fire within a combustible framing cavity to other areas.

== Description and function ==
In wood-framed construction, fire blocking usually takes the form of short lengths of the same dimensional lumber used in the wall or floor/ceiling framing, installed perpendicular to the primary structural framing, completely obstructing the wall cavity. The International Residential Code (IRC) and International Building Code (IBC) both require fire blocking in combustible construction at transitions between horizontal and vertical framing, and in vertical cavities at intervals at no more than 10 feet (3.0 m) spacing between blocking, at the top and bottom of stair framing, and within exterior cornices. Other materials used for fireblocking may include noncombustible materials such as gypsum board, cement board, or mineral fiber insulation blankets.

Fire blocking is most critical in balloon framing, where a cavity may traverse multiple floors. More modern methods of platform-framing provide inherent fireblocking in most cases, since the cavity is interrupted at every floor level by top and bottom sill plates. Fire blocking may also serve as bridging between framing elements, stiffening them against lateral buckling.

Fire blocking or firestopping terminology was used interchangeably in code language from its first mention in the 1905 National Building Code (NBC), and requirements were expanded in the 1927 Uniform Building Code (UBC). Building code terminology settled on different definitions of the terms by 2000.

== See also ==
- Firestop, specifically formulated materials that prevent fire migration at joints between materials and at penetrations in building elements
