= Firestop =

Seal around openings in a fire-resistance-rated wall or floor

A firestop or fire-stopping is a form of passive fire protection that is used to seal around openings and between joints in a fire-resistance-rated wall or floor assembly. Firestops are designed to maintain the fire-resistance rating of a wall or floor assembly intended to impede the spread of fire and smoke.

== Description ==
Firestops prevent unprotected horizontal and vertical penetrations in a fire-resistance-rated wall or floor assembly from creating a route by which fire and smoke can spread that would otherwise have been fire resisting construction, e.g. where a pipe passes through a firewall.

Fire stopping is also to seal around gaps between fire resisting constructions, e.g. the linear gap between a wall and the floor above, in order for construction to form a complete barrier to fire and smoke spread.

=== Opening types ===
Firestops are used in:

- Electrical, mechanical, and structural penetrations
- Unpenetrated openings (such as openings for future use)
- Re-entries of existing firestops
- Control or sway joints in fire-resistance-rated wall or floor assemblies
- Junctions between fire-resistance-rated wall or floor assemblies
- Head-of-wall (HOW) joints, where non-load-bearing wall assemblies meet floor assemblies

Numeric characters are used to identify what penetrant, if any, can be found within the present system and help identify what UL-tested system was used.

Classification for penetrations and the barriers they penetrate, are categorized by a standardized letter-number system that has been adopted by all firestop products manufacturers. A typical system would consist of several letters, followed by a series of numbers indicating the type of penetrant that is passing through the particular barrier ex: (FB-5533.)

=== Materials ===
Components include intumescents, cementitious mortars, silicone, firestop pillows, mineral fibers, and rubber compounds.

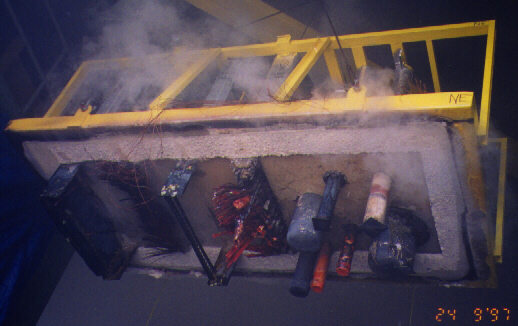
Fire test of mortar-based firestop

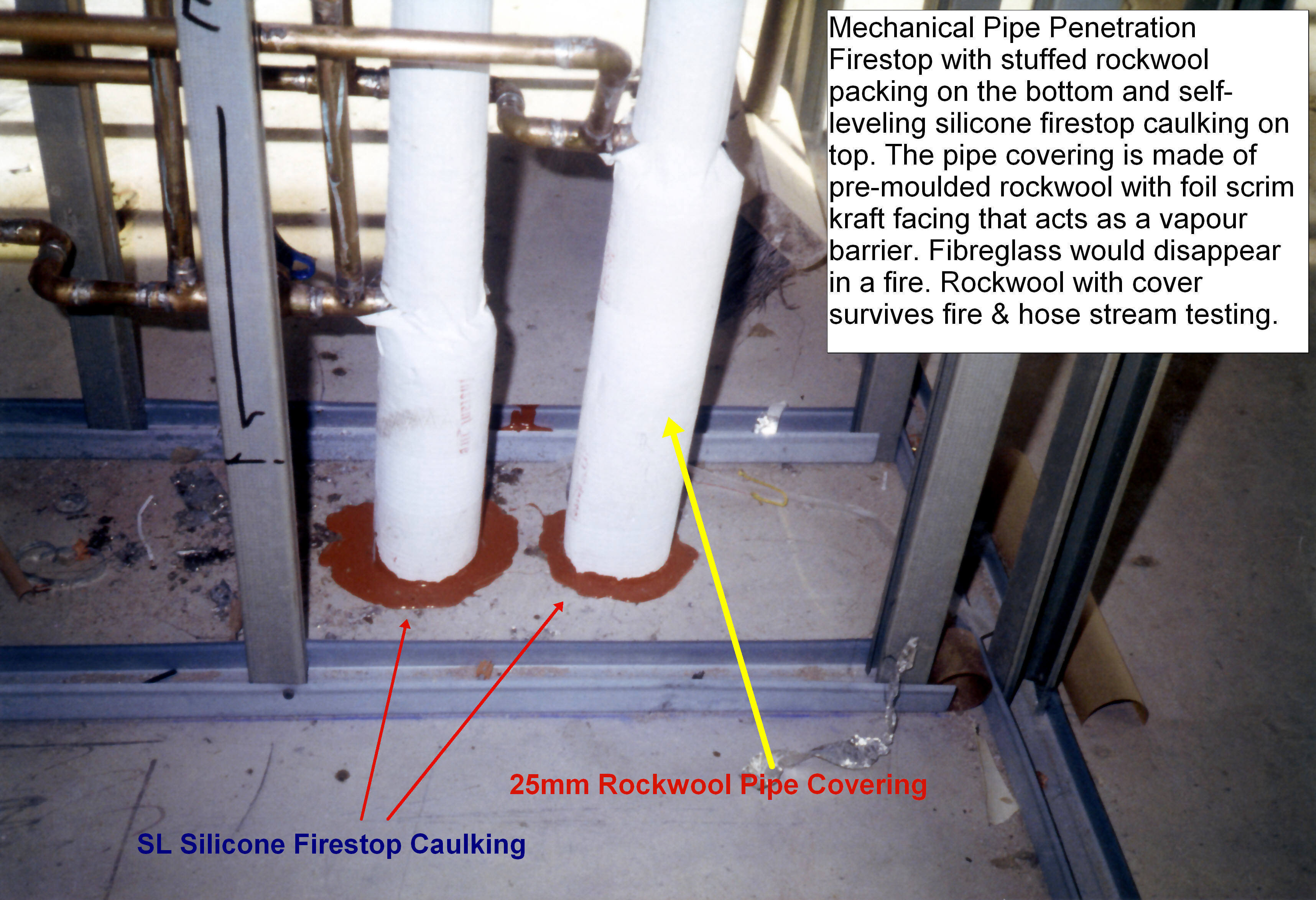
Pipe with metallic piping penetrations in a 2-hour fire-resistance rated concrete floor slab

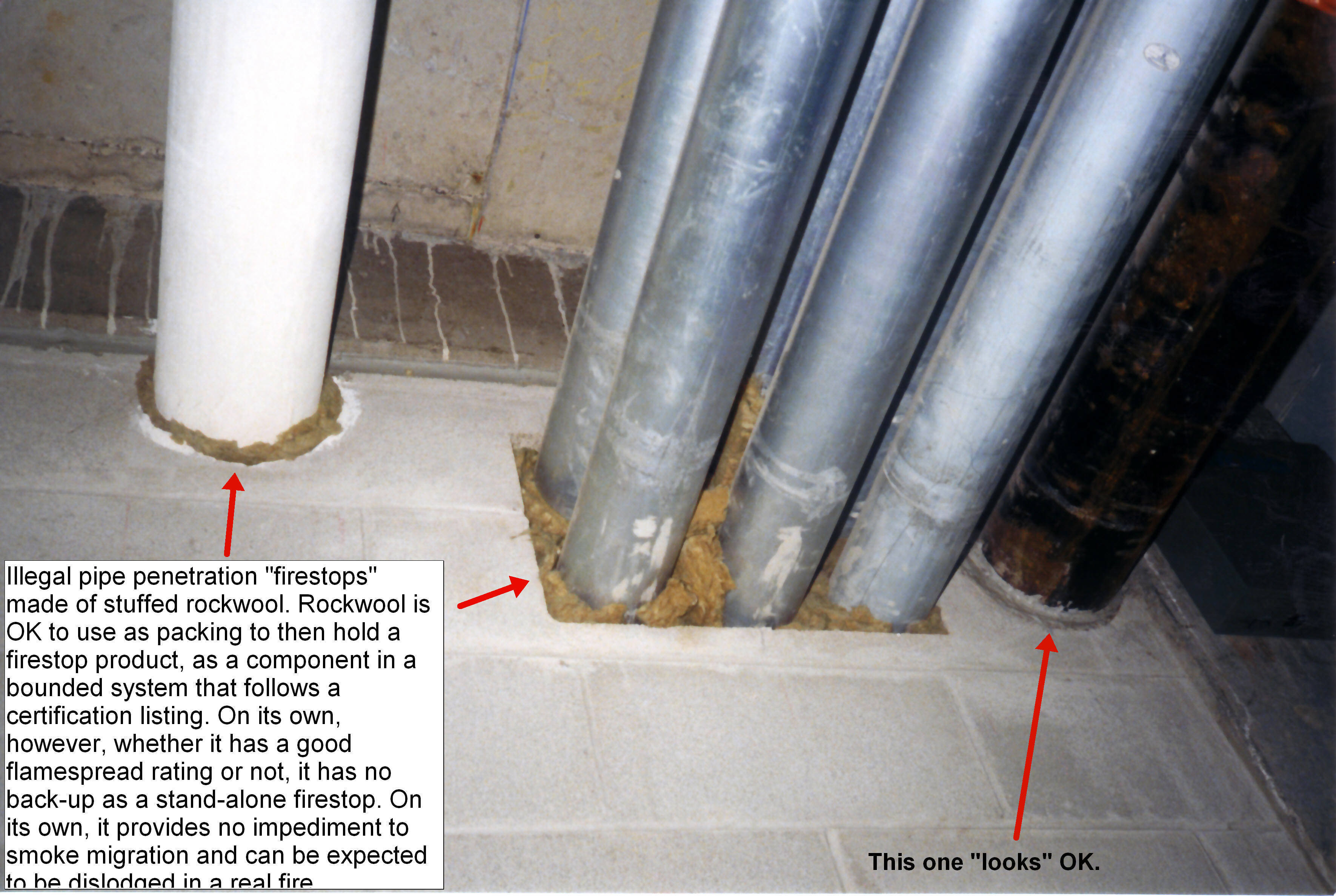
Inadequate firestop with rockwool

Construction drawing of a firestop

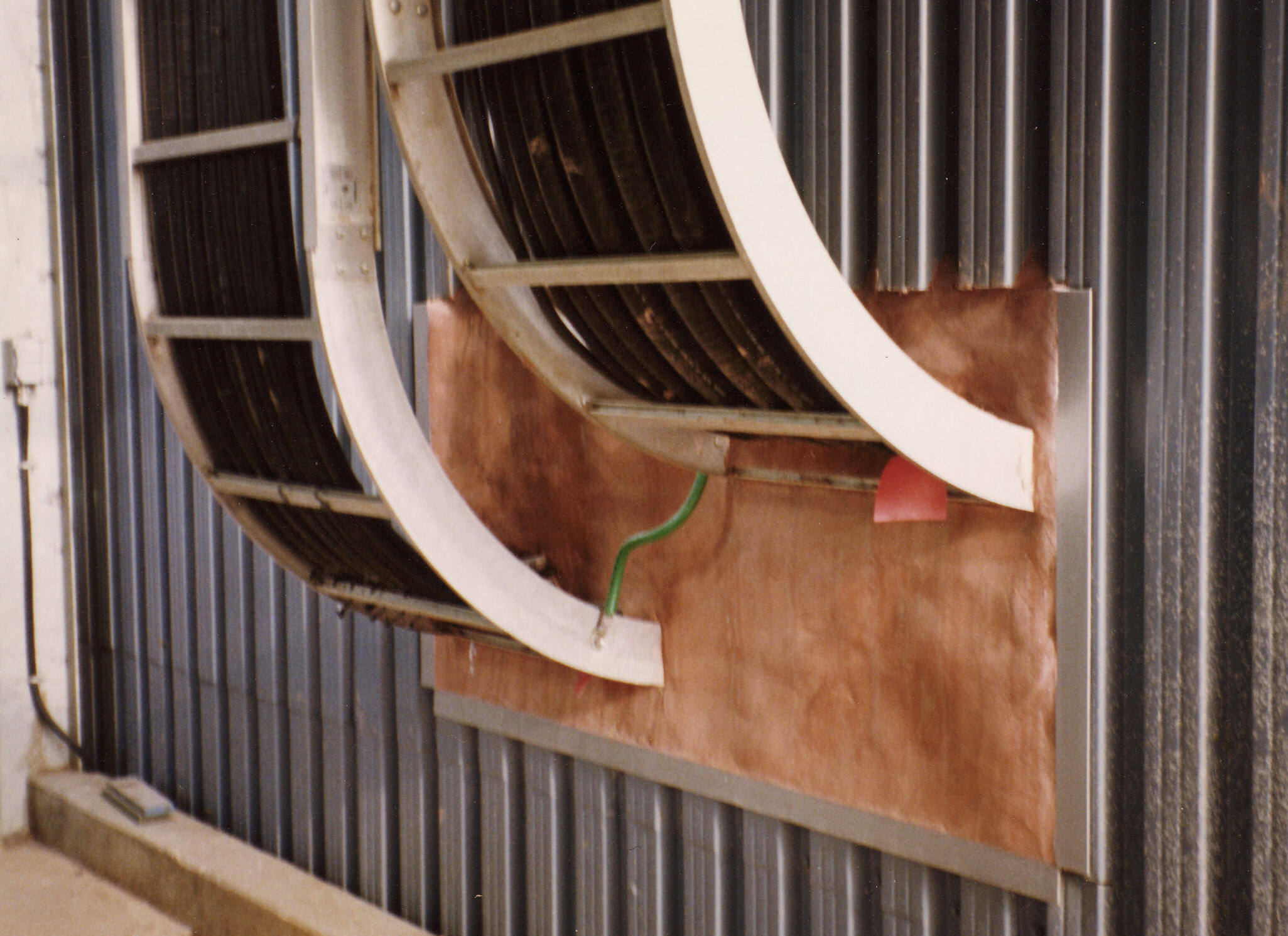
Firestop mortar seal of a cable tray

== Maintenance ==
Firestops should be maintained in accordance with the certification listing. Construction documentation sometimes includes an inventory of all firestops in a building, with drawings indicating their location and certification listings. Using this, a building owner can meet the fire code relating to fire barriers. Improper repairs may otherwise result, which would violate the fire code and could allow a fire to travel between areas intended by code to be separated during a fire.

== Ratings ==
Firestop materials are not rated per se. They receive a fire rating by combining materials in an arrangement specific to the item (a pipe or cable, for example) penetrating the fire-rated wall or floor and the construction arrangement of the fire-rated wall or floor. A two-hour-rated pipe-penetration firestop may consist of a layer of caulking over packed mineral wool. The arrangement, not the caulking, provides the two-hour rating. The individual firestop materials and the overall firestop assembly are listed.

== Testing and certification ==
Certification listings include those available from:

- Underwriters Laboratories
- Underwriters Laboratories of Canada
- Deutsches Intitut für Bautechnik (Germany)

FIRAS scheme- Warrington Fire (UK)

- Effectis (Netherlands, France, and Norway)
- FM Global

== Regulations and compliance ==
When the installed configuration does not comply with the appropriate certification listing, the fire-resistance rating may be lower than expected. Each opening in a fire-resistance-rated wall or floor in a building must have a certification listing. There are thousands of listings from various certification and testing laboratories. The Canadian and United States Underwriters Laboratories publish books listing firestop manufacturers who have contracted with them for testing and certification.

== Inadequate firestopping ==
=== No firestopping ===
Older buildings often lack firestops. A thorough inspection can identify all vertical and horizontal fire barriers and their fire ratings, and all breaches in these barriers (which can be sealed with approved methods).

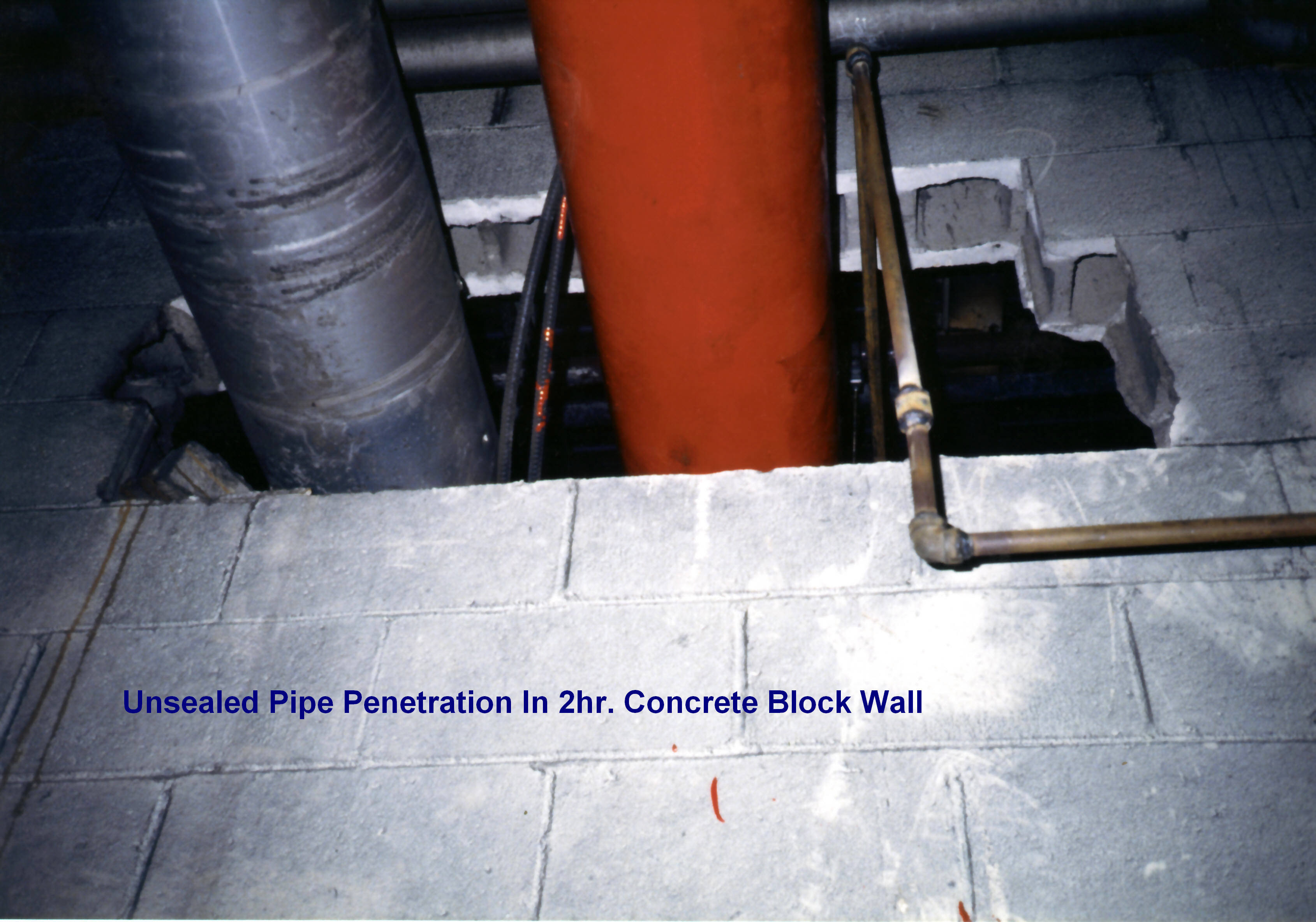
Unsealed pipe penetration in two-hour fire-resistance rated concrete block wall

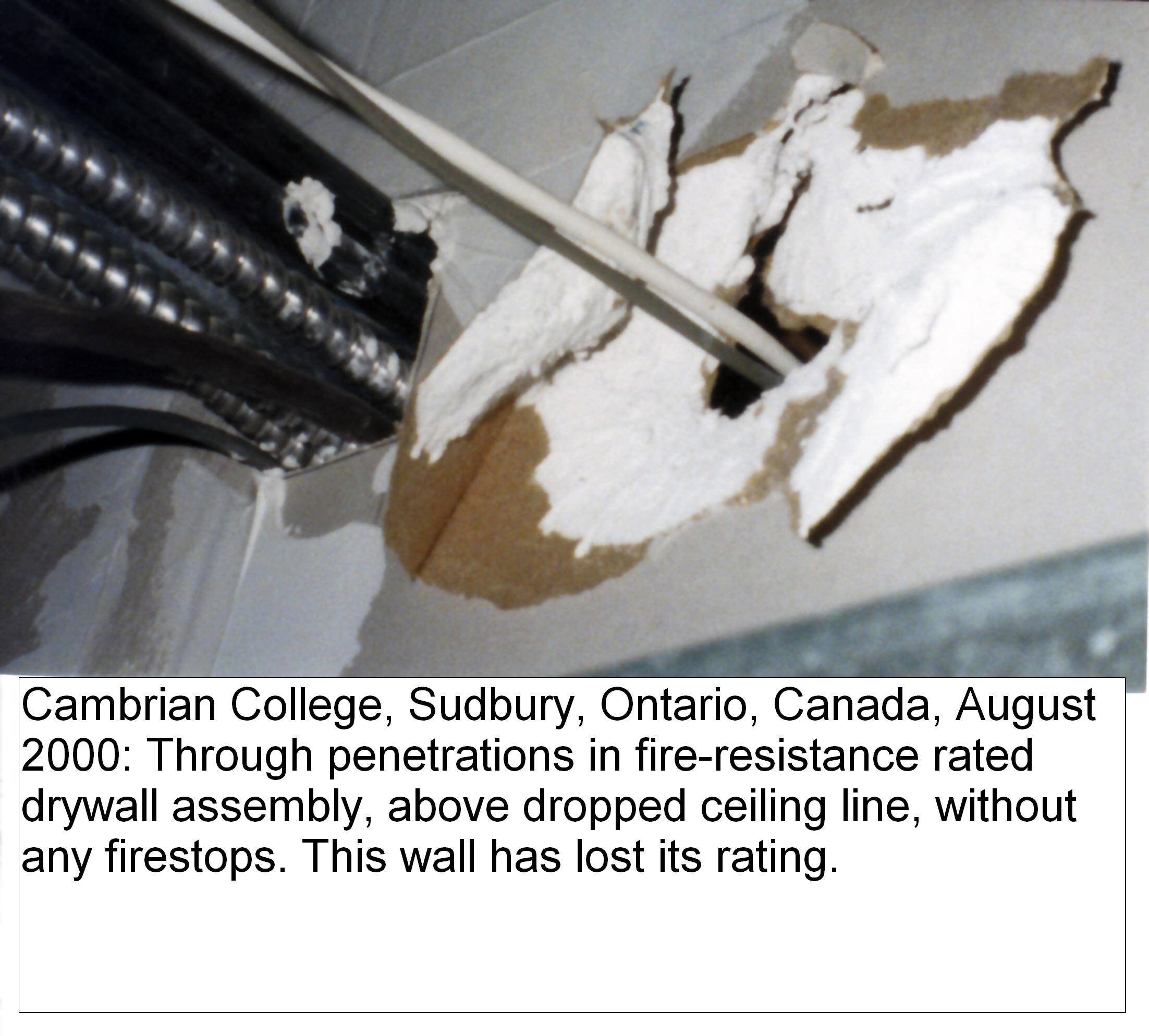
Improper breach of fire-resistance rated drywall assembly

=== Non-listed attempts ===
Firestops created by contractors or building maintenance personnel which are not listed are not credited with an adequate fire resistance rating for building-code compliance purposes. They are usually short-term, cost-cutting measures at the expense of fire safety and code compliance. One common error is citing a listing for a product which may be for another use. An insulation with an active listing of a certain flame-spread rating is unacceptable for firestopping purposes.

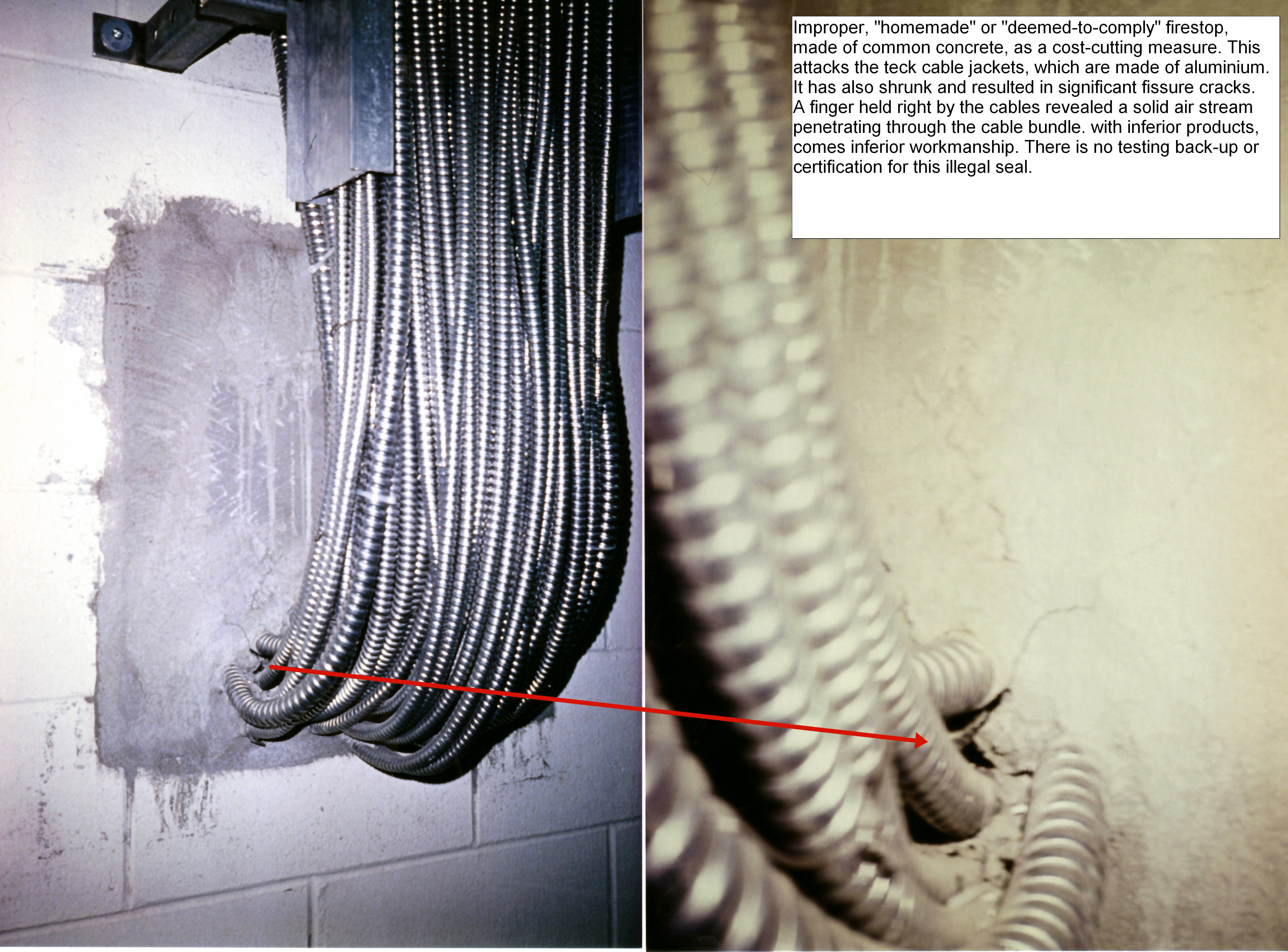
Common concrete, with no testing intended for certification listing

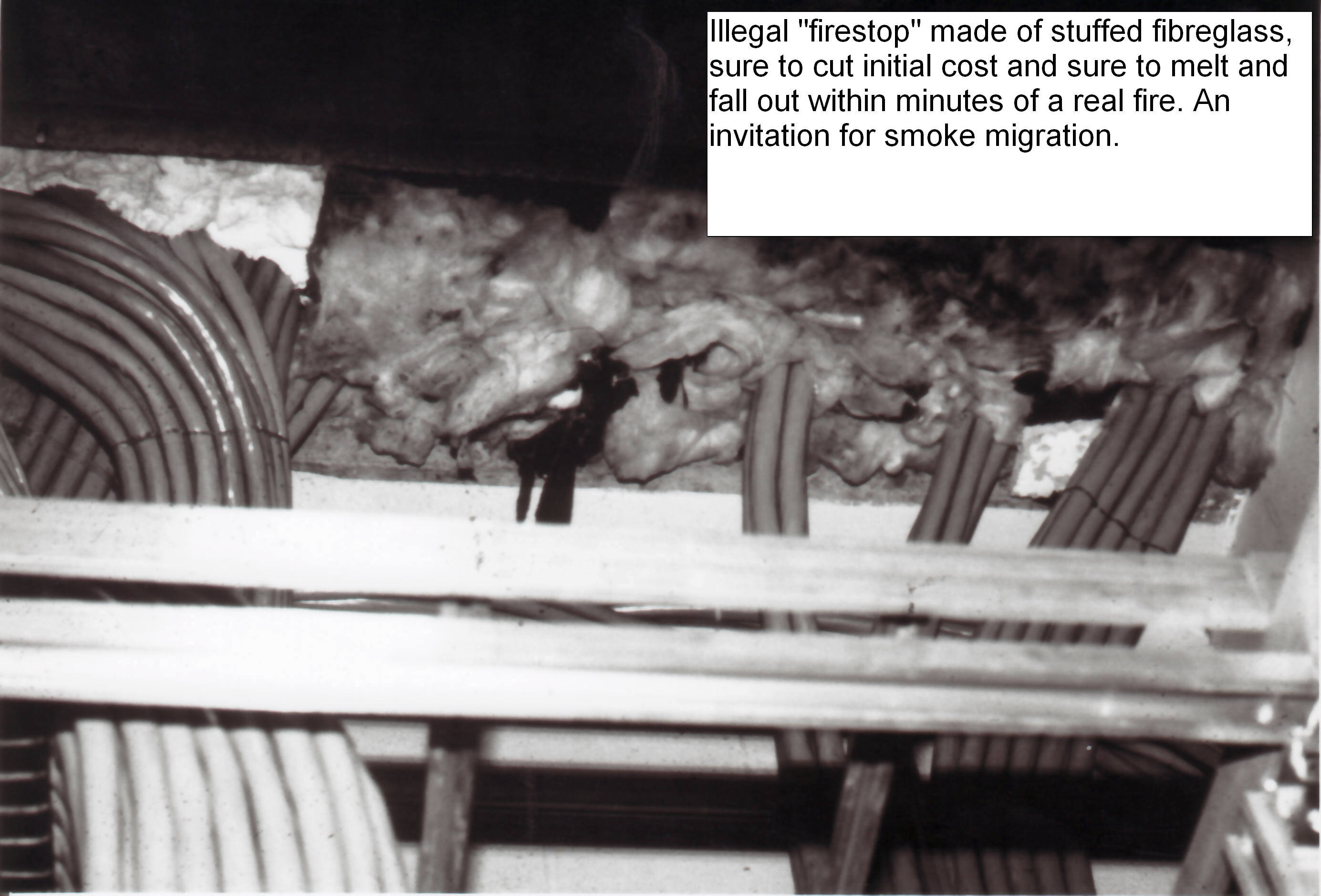
Stuffed fiberglass insulation would rapidly melt and fall out in a fire.

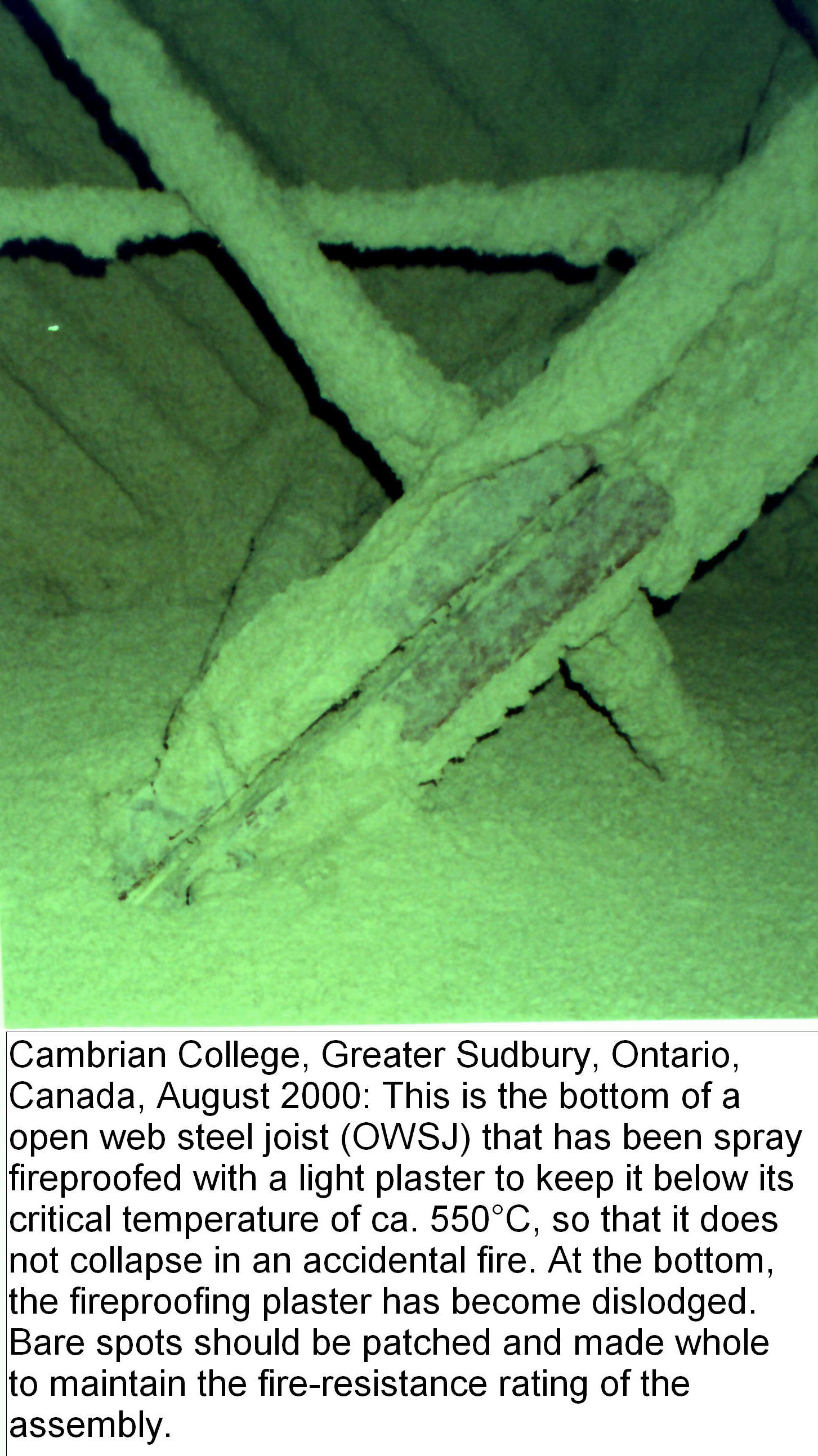
Spray fireproofing improperly used to cover penetrations

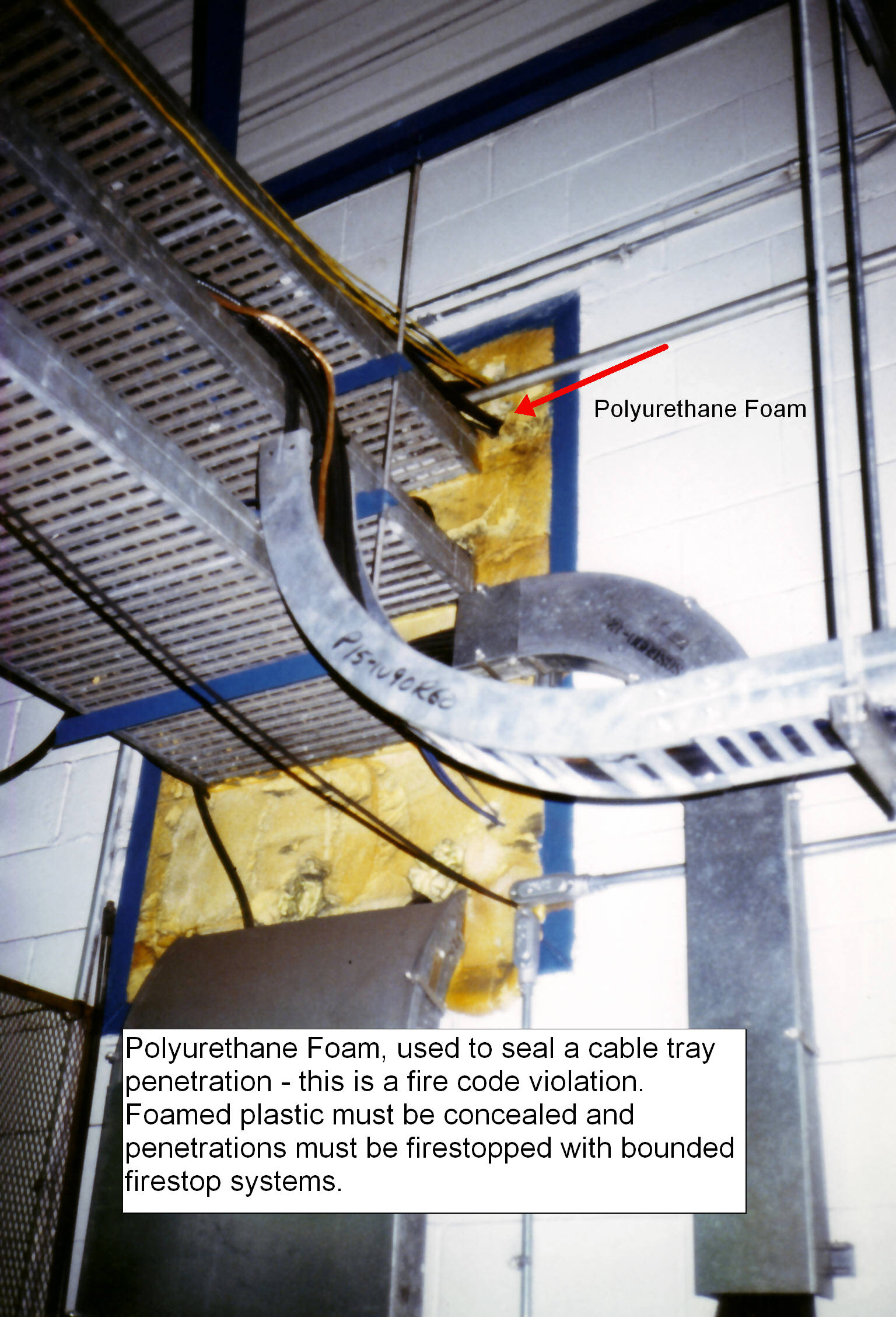
Polyurethane foam used to fill a cable tray penetration; at Browns Ferry Nuclear Power Plant, this type of seal resulted in significant fire damage.

== See also ==
- Fire blocking
- Firestop pillow
- Penetrant
- Penetration (firestop)
- Endothermic
- Annulus (firestop)
- Product certification
- Certification mark
- Silicone foam
- Packing (firestopping)
- Sleeve (construction)
- Heat sink
