= Annulus (firestop) =

Sprinkler branch pipe through-penetration with plastic sleeve - missing firestop in concrete fire separation. The space between the sleeve and the pipe is the annulus or annular space

The annulus, or annular space, is the space between a penetrant and anything that surrounds it, such as the sides of an opening or a sleeve, depending on the case. It is named after the corresponding geometric concept due to its shape.
