= Firestop pillow =

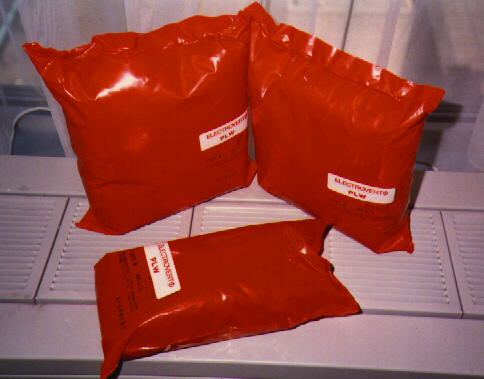
Three firestop pillows

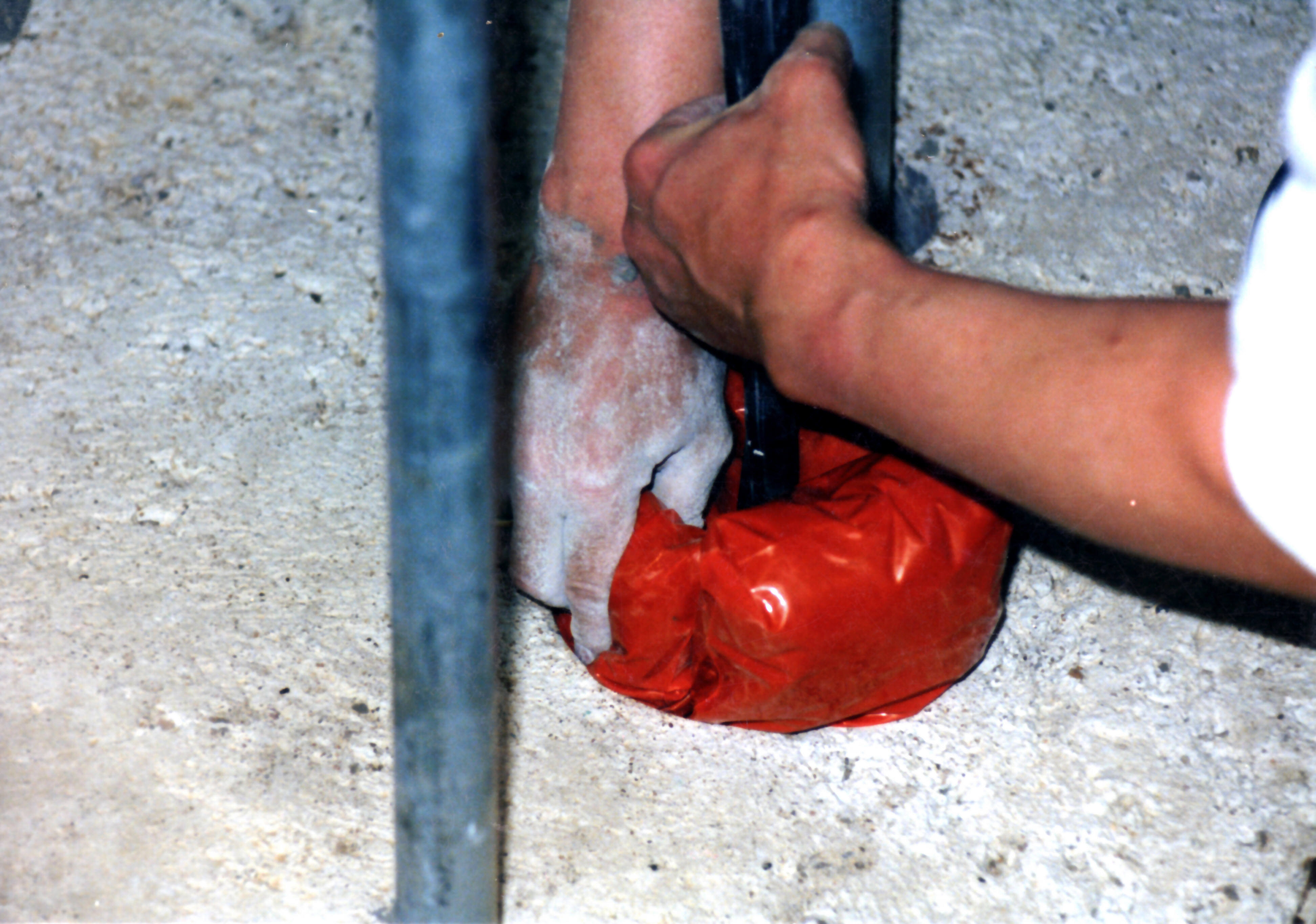
Firestop pillow sample installation, alongside other firestops, being installed for passive fire protection of buildings.

Firestop pillows are passive fire protection items used for firestopping holes to achieve fireproofing. The various kinds of firestop pillows are intended to slow the spread of fire. They are often used to meet fire-resistance ratings in conduits that need frequent access.

== Description and use ==
Firestop pillows are used for firestopping holes in wall or floor assemblies, particularly in openings that require frequent access (e.g., cable changes), requiring the removal of the firestopping and resealing after the changes are completed. The products are required to have fire-resistance ratings and to be used in accordance with a certification listing.

== Pillow types ==
Firestop pillow: Loose Fill/Fibreglass Bag type of firestop pillow. Usually this type of pillow contains a mixture of graphite and vermiculite.

There are three types of firestop pillows:

- rockwool batts with intumescent resin inside plastic bags
- vermiculite with intumescent graphite inside of fibreglass bags
- intumescent foam rubber

The intumescent resins in batt-based firestop pillows contains hydrates, or chemically bound water. On the fire side, the plastic bag burns off exposing the intumescent to the fire, which releases the water in the form of vapour or steam. The steam rises and hits the plastic bag interior on the unexposed side, where it condenses back to water, and runs back down to cool the installation below. Batt-based pillows are held in place by compressing them, allowing friction to restrain them.

The vermiculite fabric bag and the graphite are noncombustible. There is also no significant release of chemically bound water.

The foam-based pillows intumesce, swelling as a result of heat exposure.
