= Fire-resistance rating =

Duration for a passive fire protection to withstand a standard fire resistance test

A fire-resistance rating typically means the duration for which a passive fire protection system can withstand a standard fire resistance test. This can be quantified simply as a measure of time, or it may entail other criteria, involving evidence of functionality or fitness for purpose.

== Common rating systems ==
The following depict the most commonly used international time/temperature curves:

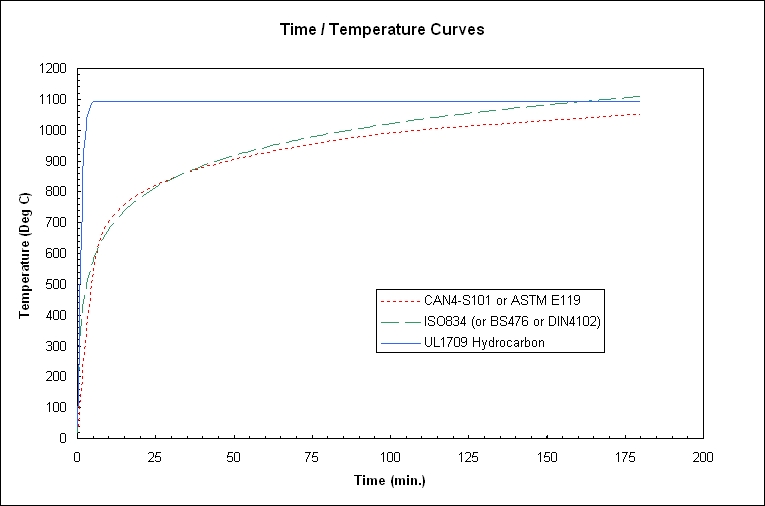
Time/temperature curves used for testing the fire-resistance rating of passive fire protection systems such as firestops, fire doors, wall and floor assemblies, etc., which are used in compartmentalisation in buildings and the petrochemical industry in Europe and North America.

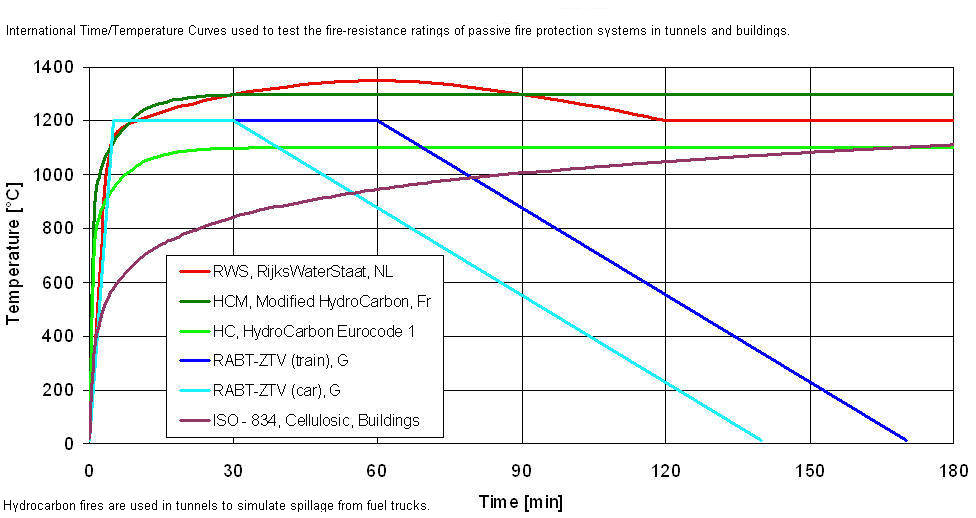
Time/temperature curves used for testing the fire-resistance rating of passive fire protection systems in tunnels in Germany, the Netherlands and France.

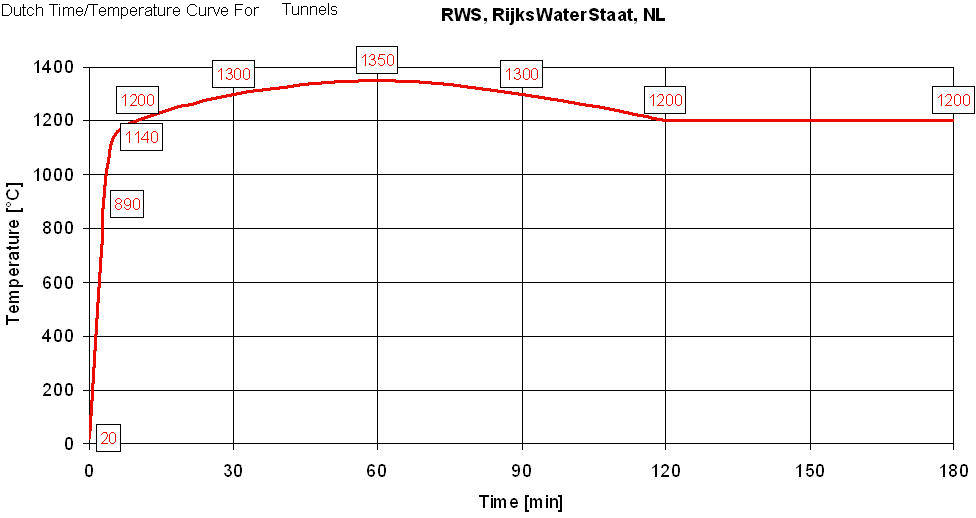
Time/temperature curve used for testing the fire-resistance rating of passive fire protection systems in tunnels in the Netherlands.

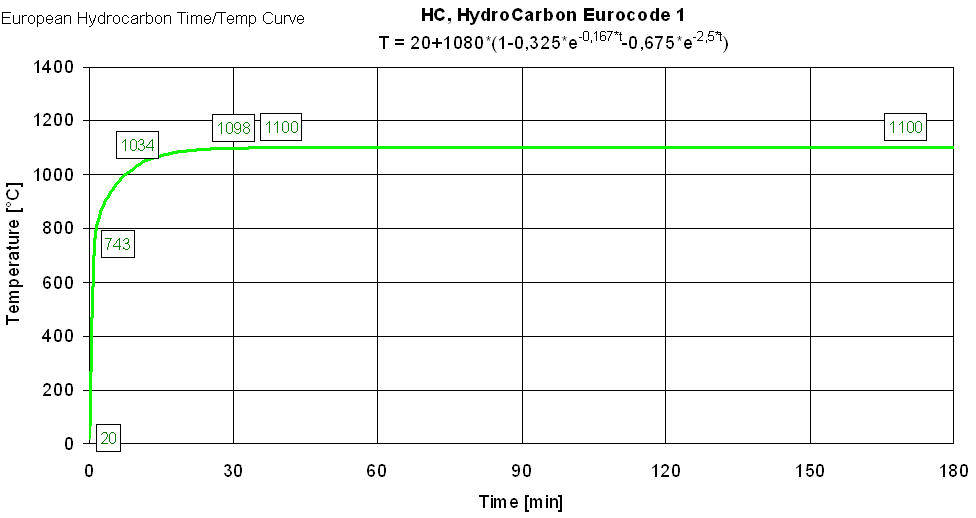
Time/temperature curve used for testing the fire-resistance rating of passive fire protection systems in Europe.

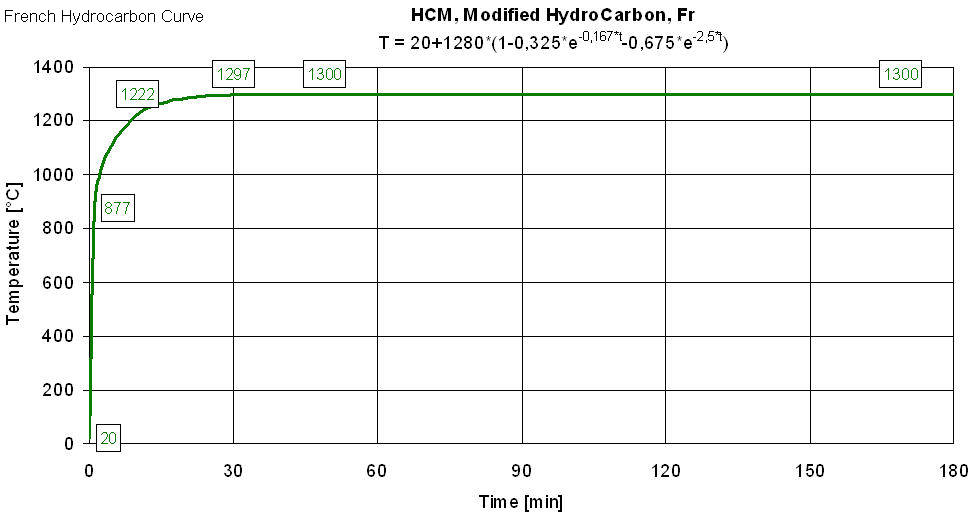
Time/temperature curve used for testing the fire-resistance rating of passive fire protection systems in tunnels in France.

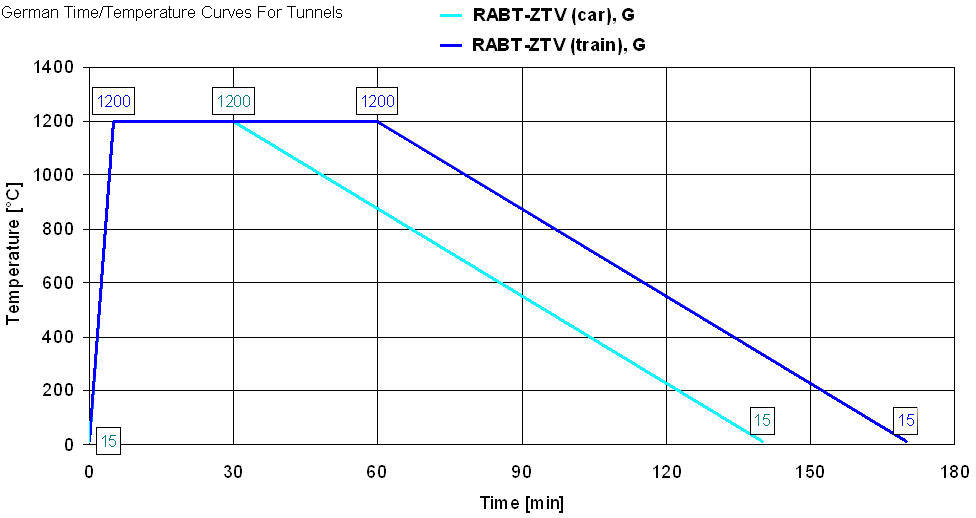
Time/temperature curve used for testing the fire-resistance rating of passive fire protection systems in tunnels in Germany.

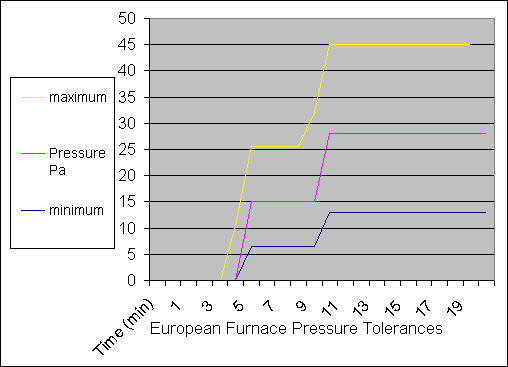
Furnace pressure is also subject to standardised tolerances for testing to obtain fire-resistance ratings. This image shows European tolerances, subject to NEN-EN 1363-1.

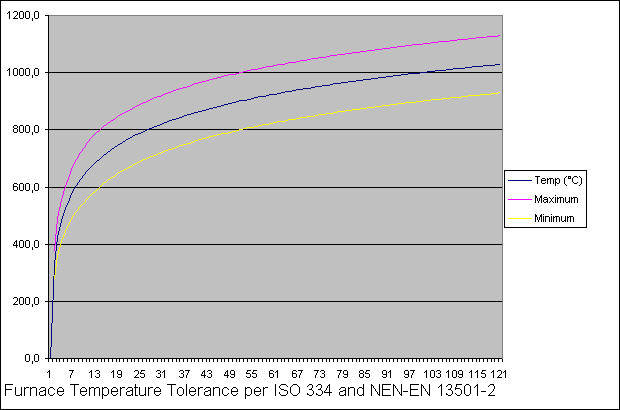
Furnace temperatures for fire testing to obtain fire-resistance ratings are subject to certain tolerances. This graph shows the tolerance applicable to the European building elements / cellulosic curve.

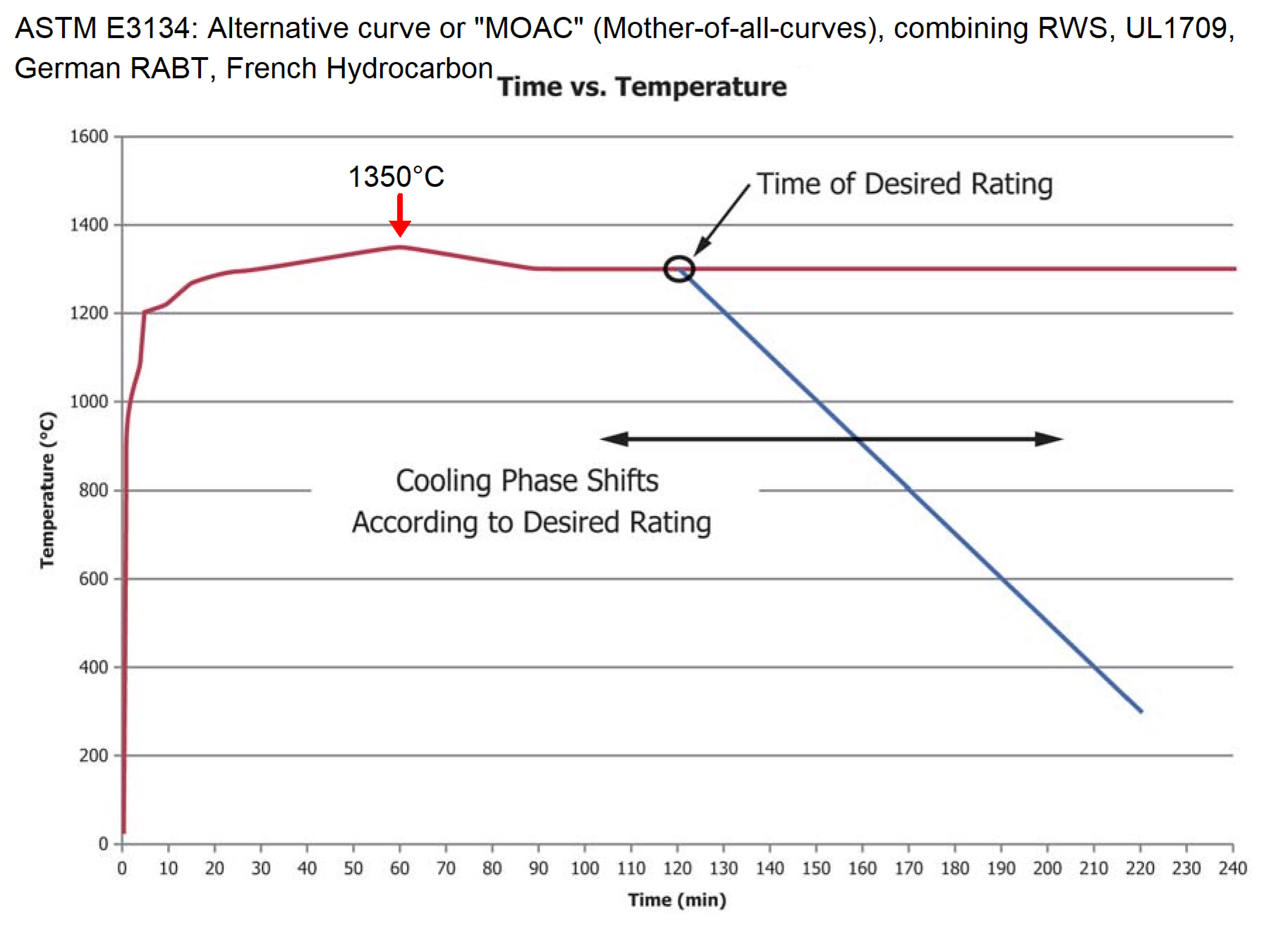
MOAC: Mother of all curves, from ASTM International

== International fire-resistance ratings ==
There are many international variations for nearly countless types of products and systems, some with multiple test requirements.

Canada's Institute for Research in Construction (a part of the National Research Council and publisher of Canada's model building code – NBC) requires a special test regime for firestops for plastic pipe penetrants. Fire endurance tests for this application must be run under 50Pa positive furnace pressure in order to adequately simulate the effect of potential temperature differences between indoor and outdoor temperatures in Canada's winters. Special hoods are applied here to provide suction on the top side of a test assembly in order to reach the 50Pa pressure differential. Afterwards, a 30PSI hose-stream test may be applied.

Outdoor spray fireproofing methods that must be qualified to the hydrocarbon curve may be required to pass a host of environmental tests before any burn takes place, to minimize the likelihood of ordinary operational environments rendering a vital system component useless before it ever encounters a fire.

If critical environmental conditions are not satisfied, an assembly may not be eligible for a fire-resistance rating.

== Tests for fire resistance of record protection equipment ==
The following classifications may be attained when testing in accordance with UL 72.

=== Class 125 Rating ===
This rating is the requirement in data safes and vault structures for protecting digital information on magnetic media or hard drives. Temperatures inside the protected chamber must be held below 125 °F (52 °C) for the time period specified, such as Class 125-2 Hour, with temperatures up to 2,000 °F (1,090 °C) outside the vault. The temperature reading is taken on the inside surfaces of the protective structure. Maintaining the temperature below 125 °F is critical because data is lost above that temperature threshold, even if the media or hard drives appear to be intact.

=== Class 150 Rating ===
This is the rating required to protect microfilm, microfiche, and other film-based information storage media. Above 150 °F (66 °C) film is distorted by the heat and information is lost. A Class 150-2 Hour vault must keep the temperature below 150 °F for at least two hours, with temperatures up to 2,000 °F (1,090 °C) outside the vault.

=== Class 350 Rating ===
This rating is the requirement for protecting paper documents. Above 350 °F (177 °C) paper is distorted by the heat and information is lost. A Class 350-4 Hour vault must keep the temperature below 350 °F for at least four hours, with temperatures up to 2,000 °F (1,090 °C) outside the vault.

== Different time/temperature curves ==
Typically, most countries use the building elements curve for residential and commercial spaces, which is nearly identical in most countries as that is what results by burning wood. The building elements curve is characterized jointly by, including, but not limited to, DIN4102, BS476, ASTM E119, ULC-S101, etc. For industrial facilities in the hydrocarbon and petrochemical industries, a hydrocarbon curve (such as UL 1709) is used, reflecting a more rapid temperature rise. The only commonly used exposure beyond this, apart from the more recent tunnel curves shown above, would be the jet fire exposure standards such as ISO 22899, which are used where equipment may be subject to the extreme heat and momentum effects of jet fire exposure.

During a fire in a tunnel, as well as in the petrochemical industry, temperatures exceed those of ordinary building (cellulosic) fires. This is because the fuel for the fire is hydrocarbons, which burn hotter (compare hydrocarbon curve above to ASTM E119 curve), faster and typically run out of fuel faster as well, compared against timber. The added complication with tunnels is that heat cannot escape as well as it can in open area. Instead, the fire is confined to a narrow tube, where pressure and heat build up and spread rapidly, with little room for escape and little chance of compartmentalization.

== Example of a fire stop test ==
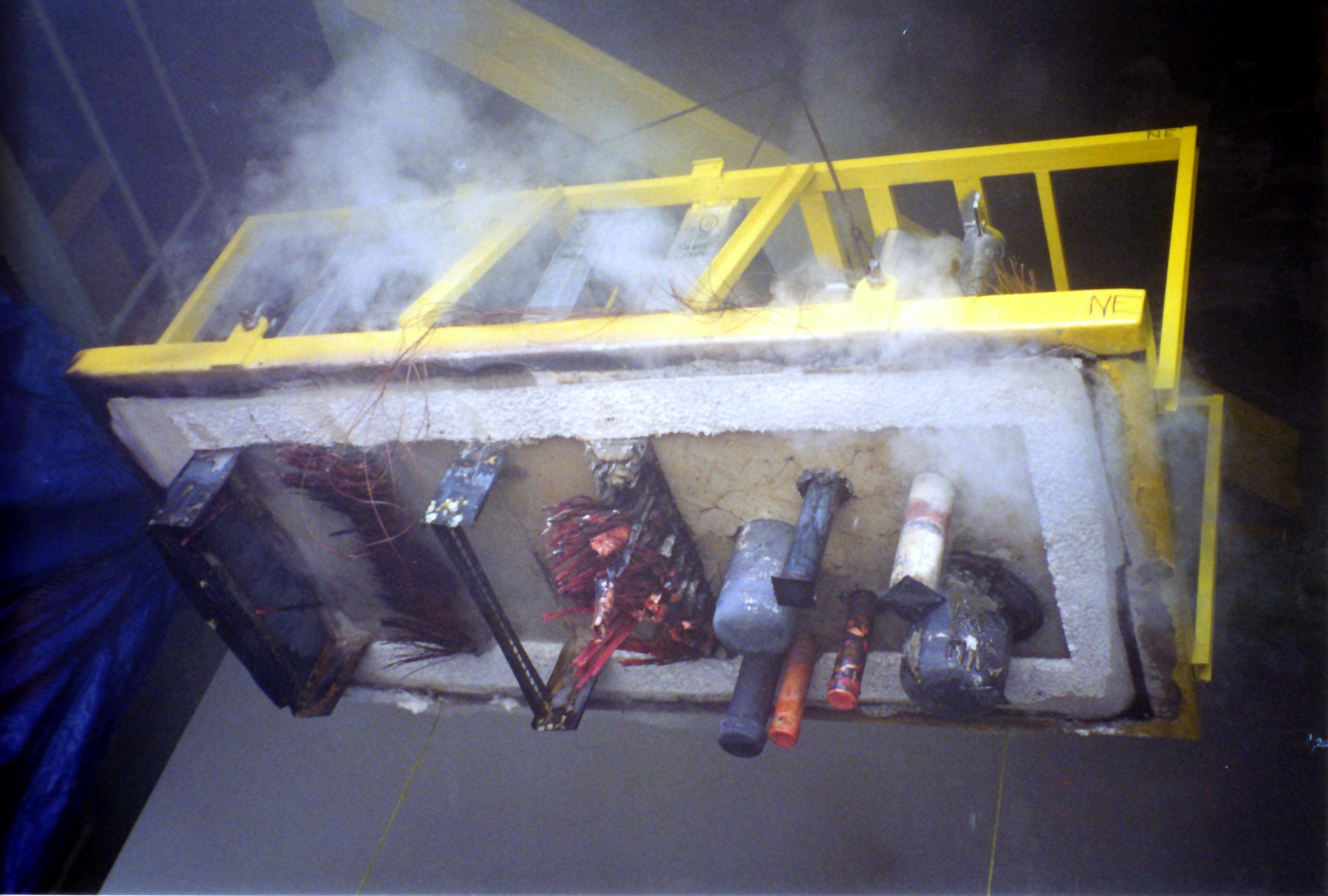
Fire test assembly

Construction of a test sample consists of a mockup of a section of concrete floor, with typical mechanical and electrical utility components (pipes and cables) penetrating the floor assembly. A firestop mortar is applied around the penetrations.

The completed test sample is inserted into a furnace such that one side is exposed to a fire. The test is terminated when the fire stops successfully meet the test criteria in minimizing the amount of heat and smoke allowed to pass through the assembly, when the fire penetrates the fire stops. This determines the fire stop F-Rating. The length of time required for a penetrant or sample on average to exceed a specified average heat rise above ambient at any single location determines the duration for the FT Rating (Fire and Temperature). If a hose-stream test is passed afterwards, the rating can then be expressed as an FTH Rating (Fire, Temperature and Hose-stream). The lowest of the three determines the overall rating.

== See also ==
- Building code
- Certification listing
- Construction
- Deutsches Institut für Bautechnik
- EN 16034
- Endothermic
- Fire protection
- Fireproofing
- Firestop
- Firestop pillow
- Firewall (construction)
- Intumescent
- Mortar (firestop)
- Passive fire protection
