= Passive fire protection =

Component or system to passively prevent the spread of fire

Fire-resistance rated wall assembly with fire door, cable tray penetration and intumescent cable coating

Passive fire protection (PFP) is components or systems of a building or structure that slows or impedes the spread of the effects of fire or smoke without system activation, and usually without movement. Examples of passive systems include floor-ceilings and roofs, fire doors, windows, and wall assemblies, fire-resistant coatings, and other fire and smoke control assemblies. Passive fire protection systems can include active components such as fire dampers.

== Main characteristics ==
Passive fire protection systems are intended to:

- Contain a fire to the compartment of fire origin
- Slow a fire from spreading from the compartment of fire origin
- Slow the heating of structural members
- Prevent the spread of fire through intentional openings (e.g., doors, HVAC ducts) in fire rated assemblies by the use of a fire rated closure (e.g., fire door, fire damper)
- Prevent the spread of fire through penetrations (e.g., holes in fire walls through which building systems such as plumbing pipes or electrical cables pass) in fire rated assemblies by the use of fire stops

PFP systems are designed to "prevent" the spread of fire and smoke, or heating of structural members, for an intended limited period of time as determined by the local building code and fire codes. Passive fire protection measures such as firestops, fire walls, and fire doors, are tested to determine the fire-resistance rating of the final assembly, which is usually expressed in terms of hours of fire resistance (e.g., ⅓, ¾, 1, 1½, 2, 3, 4 hour). A certification listing provides the limitations of the rating.

Passive fire protection systems typically do not require motion. Exceptions are fire dampers (fire-resistive closures within air ducts, excluding grease ducts) and fire door closers, which move, open and shut in order to work, as well as all intumescent products which swell in order to provide adequate material thickness and fill gaps. The simplicity of PFP systems usually results in higher reliability as compared to active fire protection systems such as sprinkler systems which require several operational components for proper functioning.

PFP in a building perform as a group of systems within systems. For example, an installed firestop system is part of a fire-resistance rated wall system or floor system, which is in turn a part of a fire compartment which forms an integral part of the overall building which operates as a system.

Different types of materials are employed in the design and construction of PFP systems. Endothermic materials absorb heat, including calcium silicate board, concrete and gypsum wallboard. For example, water can boil out of a concrete slab when heated. The chemically bound water inside these materials sublimates when heated. PFP measures also include intumescents and ablative materials. Materials themselves are not fire resistance rated. They must be organised into systems which bear a fire resistance rating when installed in accordance with certification listings (e.g., DIN 4102 Part 4).

There are mainly two types of materials that provide structural fire resistance: intumescent and vermiculite. Vermiculite materials cover the structural steel members in a relatively thick layer. Because of the porous nature of vermiculite, its use is not advisable if there is the possibility of water exposure. Steel corrosion is also difficult to monitor. Intumescent fireproofing is a layer of a material which is applied like paint on the structural steel members. The thickness of this intumescent coating is dependent on the steel section used. Intumescent coatings are applied in a relatively low thickness (usually 350- to 700-micrometer), have a more aesthetic smooth finish, and help prevent corrosion.

PFP system performance is typically demonstrated in fire tests. A typical test objective for fire rated assemblies is to maintain the item or the side to be protected at or below either 140 °C (for walls, floors and electrical circuits required to have a fire-resistance rating). A typical test objective (e.g., ASTM E119) for fire rated structural protection is to limit the temperature of the structural element (e.g., beam, column) to ca. 538 °C, at which point the yield strength of the structural element has been sufficiently reduced that structural building collapse may occur. Typical test standards for walls and floors are BS 476: Part 22: 1987, BS EN 1364-1: 1999 & BS EN 1364-2: 1999 or ASTM E119. Smaller components such as fire dampers, fire doors, etc., follow suit in the main intentions of the basic standard for walls and floors. Fire testing involves live fire exposures upwards of 1100 °C, depending on the fire-resistance rating and duration one is after. Test objectives other than fire exposures are sometimes included such as hose stream impact to determine the survivability of the system under realistic conditions.

== Examples ==
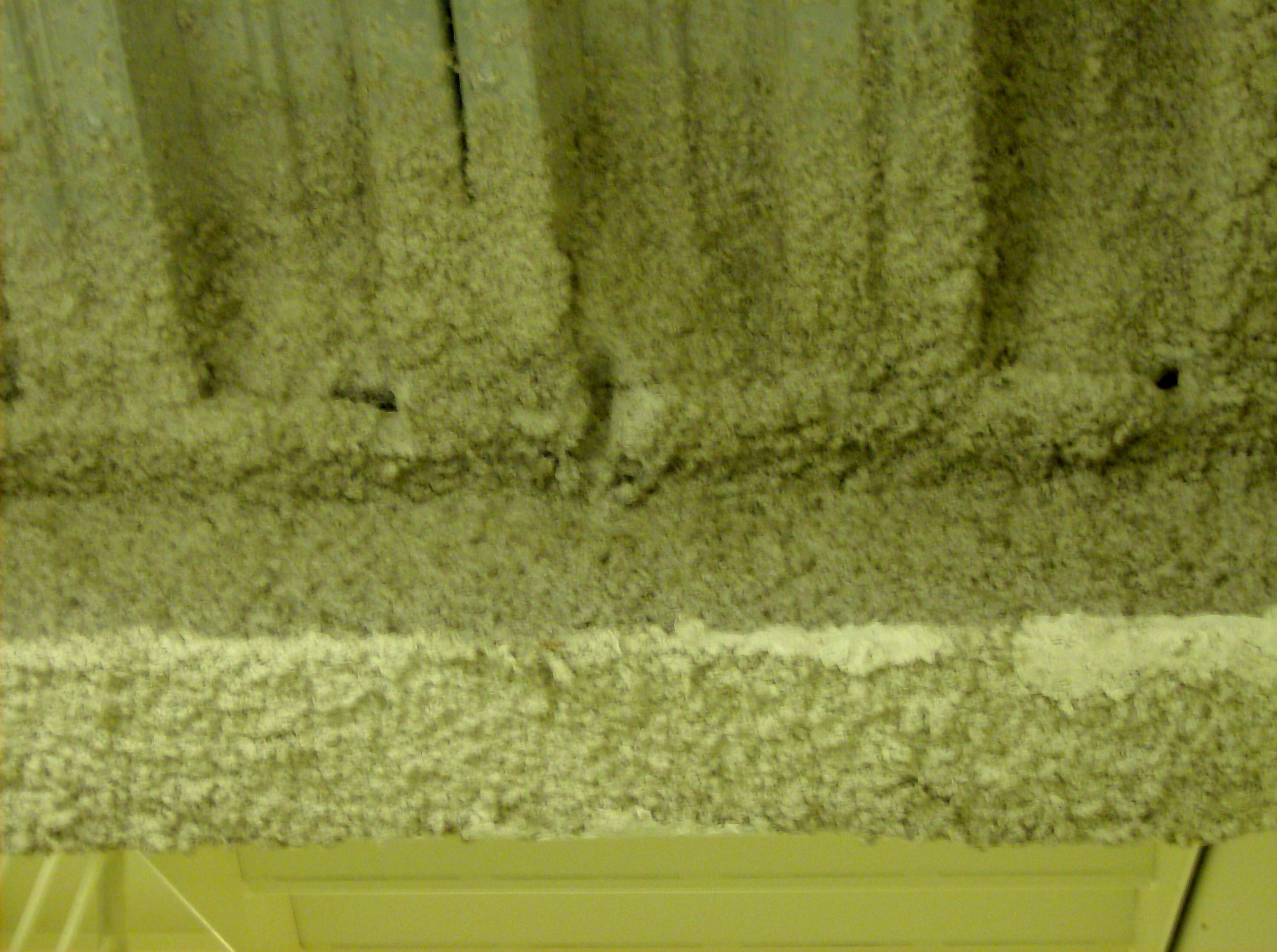
This I beam has a fireproofing material sprayed onto it as a form of passive fire protection.

- Fire-resistance rated walls
- Firewalls not only have a rating, but are also designed to sub-divide buildings such that if collapse occurs on one side, this will not affect the other side. They can also be used to eliminate the need for sprinklers, as a trade-off.
- Fire-resistant glass using multi-layer intumescent technology or wire mesh embedded within the glass may be used in the fabrication of fire-resistance rated windows in walls or fire doors.
- Fire-resistance rated floors
- Fire compartmentation (barriers designated as occupancy separations are intended to segregate parts of buildings, where different uses are on each side; for instance, apartments on one side and stores on the other side of the occupancy separation).
- Closures (fire dampers) Sometimes firestops are treated in building codes identically to closures. Canada de-rates closures, where, for instance a 2-hour closure is acceptable for use in a 3-hour fire separation, so long as the fire separation is not an occupancy separation or firewall. The lowered rating is then referred to as a fire protection rating, both for firestops, unless they contain plastic pipes and regular closures.
- Firestops
- Grease ducts (These refer to ducts that lead from commercial cooking equipment such as ranges, deep fryers and double-decker and conveyor-equipped pizza ovens to grease duct fans.) In North America, grease ducts are made of minimum 16 gauge (1.6 mm) sheet metal, all welded, and certified openings for cleaning, whereby the ducting is either inherently manufactured to have a specific fire-resistance rating, OR it is ordinary 16 gauge ductwork with an exterior layer of purpose-made and certified fireproofing. Either way, North American grease ducts must comply with NFPA96 requirements.
- Cable coating (application of fire retardants, which are either endothermic or intumescent, to reduce flamespread and smoke development of combustible cable-jacketing)
- Spray fireproofing (application of intumescent or endothermic paints, or fibrous or cementitious plasters to keep substrates such as structural steel, electrical or mechanical services, valves, liquefied petroleum gas (LPG) vessels, vessel skirts, bulkheads or decks below either 140 °C for electrical items or ca. 500 °C for structural steel elements to maintain operability of the item to be protected)
- Fireproofing cladding (boards used for the same purpose and in the same applications as spray fireproofing) Materials for such cladding include perlite, vermiculite, calcium silicate, gypsum, intumescent epoxy, Durasteel (cellulose-fibre reinforced concrete and punched sheet-metal bonded composite panels), MicroTherm
- Enclosures (boxes or wraps made of fireproofing materials, including fire-resistive wraps and tapes to protect speciality valves and other items deemed to require protection against fire and heat—an analogy for this would be a safe) or the provision of circuit integrity measures to keep electrical cables operational during an accidental fire.

== Regulations ==
Examples of testing that underlies certification listing:

- Europe: BS EN 1364
- Netherlands: NEN 6068
- Germany: DIN 4102
- United Kingdom: BS 476
- Canada: ULC-S101
- United States: ASTM E119
- South Africa: SANS 10117

Each of these test procedures have very similar fire endurance regimes and heat transfer limitations. Differences include the hose-stream tests, which are unique to Canada and the United States, whereas Germany includes an impact test during the fire for firewalls. Germany is unique in including heat induced expansion and collapse of ferrous cable trays into account for firestops resulting in the favouring of firestop mortars which tend to hold the penetrating cable tray in place, whereas firestops made of rockwool and elastomeric toppings have been demonstrated in testing by Otto Graf institute to be torn open and rendered inoperable when the cable tray expands, pushes in and then collapses.

In exterior applications for the offshore and the petroleum sectors, the fire endurance testing uses a higher temperature and faster heat rise, whereas in interior applications such as office buildings, factories and residential, the fire endurance is based upon experiences gained from burning wood. The interior fire time/temperature curve is referred to as "ETK" (Einheitstemperaturzeitkurve = standard time/temperature curve) or the "building elements" curve, whereas the high temperature variety is called the hydrocarbon curve as it is based on burning oil and gas products, which burn hotter and faster. The most severe fire exposure test is the British "jetfire" test, which has been used to some extent in the UK and Norway but is not typically found in common regulations.

== Prescriptive versus listed ==
Prescriptive systems have been tested and verified by governmental authorities including DIBt, the British Standards Institute (BSI) and the National Research Council's Institute for Research in Construction. These organisations publish wall and floor assembly details in codes and standards that are used with generic standardised components to achieve the quantified fire-resistance ratings. Germany and the UK publish prescriptive systems in standards such as DIN4102 Part 4 (Germany) and BS476 (United Kingdom).

Listed systems are certified by testing in which the installed configuration must comply with the tolerances and materials set out in the certification listing. The United Kingdom is an exception to this as certification is required but not testing.

== Countries with optional certification ==
Fire tests in the UK are reported in the form of test results but building authorities do not require written proof that the materials that have been installed on site are actually identical to the materials and products that were used in the test. The test report is often interpreted by engineers as the test results are not communicated in uniformly structured listings. In the UK, and other countries which do not require certification, the proof that the manufacturer has not substituted other materials apart from those used in the original testing is based on trust in the manufacturer.

== See also ==
- Combustibility and flammability
- Drywall
- Fire protection engineering
- Fire-resistance rating
- Firestop pillow
- Mortar (firestop)
- Pressurisation ductwork
- Smoke exhaust ductwork
