= Penetrant (mechanical, electrical, or structural) =

Penetrants, or penetrating items, are the mechanical, electrical or structural items that pass through an opening in a wall or floor, such as pipes, electrical conduits, ducting, electrical cables and cable trays, or structural steel beams and columns. When these items pierce a wall or floor assembly, they create a space between the penetrant and the surrounding structure which can become an avenue for the spread of fire between rooms or floors. Building codes require a firestop to seal the openings around penetrants.

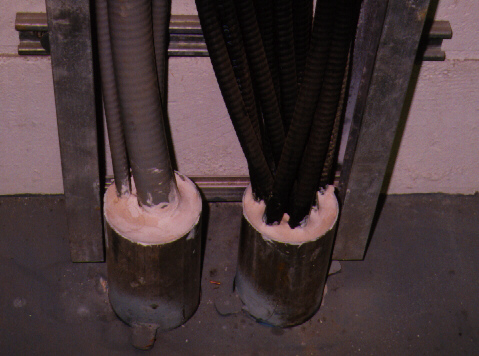
Electrical cable through-penetration, fire-stopped by an intumescent sealant, to restore the two-hour fire-resistance rating of the concrete floor.

Steel beam through-penetration.
