= A. Schulman =

American chemical company

A. Schulman, Inc.
- Company type: Public
- Traded as: Nasdaq: SHLM
- Industry: Chemicals
- Founded: 1928; 98 years ago
- Founder: Alex Schulman
- Defunct: 2018
- Fate: Acquired by LyondellBasell.
- Successor: LyondellBasell
- Headquarters: Fairlawn, Ohio, United States
- Key people: Joseph Gingo (CEO, chairman, and president)
- Products: Plastic compounds; Color concentrates; Additives
- Revenue: ▼$2.461 billion (2017)
- Net income: ▲$0.025 billion (2017)
- Total assets: ▲$1.753 billion (2017)
- Total equity: ▲$0.207 billion (2017)
- Number of employees: 4,900
- Website: aschulman.com

A. Schulman, Inc. was an American supplier of plastic compounding products, color concentrates, and additives before its acquisition by LyondellBasell in 2018.

== Products ==
The company's products include:

- Low (LDPE) and high (HDPE) density polyethylenes under the Polyflam brand
- Polystyrene (PS), polypropylene (PP) and polyphenylene sulphide (PPS) also under the Polyflam brand
- Several derivaterized styrene polymers (ABS, Methyl Methacrylate Acrylonitrile Butadiene Styrene (MABS) and blends (ABS/PA, PC/ABS), polymethylmethacrylate (PMMA), and polycarbonate (PC) and blends (PC/PBT), under the Polyman brand
- Polyacetyls (POM) under the Schulaform brand
- Polyamides PA6 and PA66 under the Schulamid brand
- Polybutylene terephthalate (PBT) under the Schuladur A brand
- Polyurethane (PUR) under the Polypur brand
- Polyvinyl chloride (PVC) under the Polyvin brand
- Styrene acrylonitrile copolymer (SAN) under the Polyfort brand

== History ==
The company was founded in 1928 by Alex Schulman by selling rubber products from a plant in Akron, Ohio.

In 1972, the company became a public company via an initial public offering.

In 1994, the company acquired Comalloy International, a subsidiary of Exxon based in Nashville, Tennessee.

In February 1995, the company acquired Texas Polymer Services.

In 1996, the company acquired the Specialty Compounding Division of Laurel Industries Inc., from Occidental Petroleum.

In 2007, the company acquired Delta Plast Group, based in Sweden.

In February 2008, the Company closed its facility in St. Thomas, Ontario.

In 2009, the company opened a Polybatch plant in Akron, Ohio.

In 2010, the company acquired McCann Color and closed its facility in Sharon Center, Ohio.

In April 2010, the company acquired ICO for $191 million.

Also in 2010, the company acquired Mash Compostos Plasticos of Brazil.

In 2016, the company sued the former owners of Citadel Plastics, a company it had previously acquired, for $272 million, claiming that they falsified information about the recycled content and other attributes of its products and that A. Schulman later had to stop selling these products.
