= Aluminium diethyl phosphinate =

Names
- Other names Diethyl phosphinic acid aluminium salt, Exolit OP 930, Exolit OP 935, Exolit OP 1230, Exolit OP 1240, AlPi

Identifiers
CAS Number	225789-38-8
3D model (JSmol)	Interactive image
ChemSpider	62910285
ECHA InfoCard	100.109.377
EC Number	607-114-5
PubChem CID	21863131
CompTox Dashboard (EPA)	DTXSID00872789
- InChI: InChI=1S/3C4H11O2P.Al/c3*1-3-7(5,6)4-2;/h3*3-4H2,1-2H3,(H,5,6);/q;;;+3/p-3 Key: XSAOTYCWGCRGCP-UHFFFAOYSA-K
- SMILES: CCP(=O)(CC)[O-].CCP(=O)(CC)[O-].CCP(=O)(CC)[O-].[Al+3]

Properties
Chemical formula	((C_{2}H_{5})_{2}PO_{2})_{3}Al
Molar mass	390.3 g/mol
Appearance	White powder
Density	1.35 g/cm3, solid
Melting point	Decomposes, see text
Solubility in water	2000 mg/L at 25°C
- Except where otherwise noted, data are given for materials in their standard state (at 25 °C [77 °F], 100 kPa). Infobox references

Aluminium diethyl phosphinate is a chemical compound with formula Al(C_{4}H_{10}O_{2}P)_{3}. It is the aluminium salt of diethyl phosphinic acid. It is used as a halogen-free flame retardant for some polymers.

It decomposes above 300 °C.

== Applications ==
In the family of dialkyl phosphinic acid salts, aluminium diethyl phosphinate has been found to be an excellent flame retardant for use in engineering plastics such as polyamides, polyesters, thermosets and elastomers. It was developed by Hoechst AG, later by Clariant Chemicals and Ticona. In 2004 and 2012, Clariant chemicals opened its first and second commercial production lines respectively in Huerth-Knapsack near Cologne. Aluminium diethyl phosphinate acts as a flame retardant in the condensed phase in contributing to charring of the polymer matrix and thus protecting the substrate against heat and oxygen attack. In parallel it acts in the gas phase by radical reactions removing from the combustion zone the high energy radicals H. and OH., which determine flame propagation and heat release. The phosphinate partly vaporises and partly decomposes to volatile diethyl phosphinic acid and an aluminium phosphate residue, which acts as a barrier for fuel and heat transport. Aluminium diethyl phosphinate is used as a halogen-free flame retardant for polyamides, polyesters, thermoset resins (e.g. epoxies) in electrical engineering and electronics (E&E) applications for switches, plugs, PC fans, and structural and housing components. Mobile phones, washing machines, and airplane parts, among others, contain the product. Other applications include thermosetting resins and adhesives as well as cable sheaths and insulation made from thermoplastic elastomers. Aluminium diethyl phosphinate can give these plastics flame retardant properties that are otherwise only achievable with expensive high-performance plastics, which are less easy to work with. Aluminium diethyl phosphinate is often used in combination with other halogen-free flame retardant additives like melamine polyphosphate or melamine cyanurate.

In glass fibre reinforced (GF) polyamide 6 (Nylon 6) and 66 (Nylon 66) formulations as well as in polyesters like polybutylene terephthalate (PBT) and PET, aluminium diethyl phosphinate shows excellent performance in the UL 94 flammability tests (UL 94 V0 specification is met down to 0.4 mm), as well as in the glow wire tests required for appliances. Here, formulations with aluminium diethyl phosphinate meet the glow wire ignition test (GWIT) at 775 °C and the glow wire flammability test (GWFI) at 960 °C. Another important criterion in E&E applications is the Comparative Tracking Index (CTI), which determines the risk of electrical tracking of insulating material that is exposed to contaminating environments and surface conditions. With formulations containing aluminium diethyl phosphinate, the highest requirement of 600 V (numeric value of the highest voltage at which an electrical insulating material withstands 50 drops of electrolytic test solution) is achieved. Further benefits of polyamides and polyesters containing aluminium diethyl phosphinate are low smoke density which makes them suitable for rolling stock applications to EN 45545, as well as good light stability which is needed for outdoor applications.

The EU’s Restriction of Hazardous Substances Directive forced E&E manufacturers to switch to lead-free solder systems running at about 30 °C higher temperatures than traditional systems. In particular, in the so-called surface mount technology (SMT) used to connect semiconductor components mechanically and electrically to circuit boards, the resins have to withstand peak temperatures of 260 °C and more during the soldering process. This triggered the rapid growth of polymer resins based on polyamides with melting points above 300 °C, in particular PPAs and Nylon 46. The application requires the resin to pass GWIT and UL94 ratings mentioned above. Aluminium diethylphosphinate confers this flame retardancy on polyamides whilst meeting the other requirements such as CTI.

A large variety of synergists is used to tune properties of polyamide and polyester compounds.

== Human health and the environment ==
Human health and environmental facts of aluminium diethyl phosphinate are summarized in a fact sheet. Further data are given in the Arcadis Study carried out on behalf of the European Commission Health & Consumers DG, Contract number 17.020200/09/549040: “Identification and evaluation of data on flame retardants in consumer products. Final Report” of 26 April 2011, Chapter 5.23, p. 168. Aluminium diethyl phosphinate has also been investigated in projects of the US EPA Design for Environment (DfE) programme and in the European FP7 research project Enfiro. With the exception of being persistent and thus not readily biodegradable, aluminium diethyl phosphinate has been shown to have a favourable environmental and health profile.
