= Sharon Center =

Sharon Center may refer to the following places in the United States:

- Sharon Center, Iowa
- Sharon Center, Ohio
