= Cone calorimeter =

Instrument used in the field of fire safety engineering

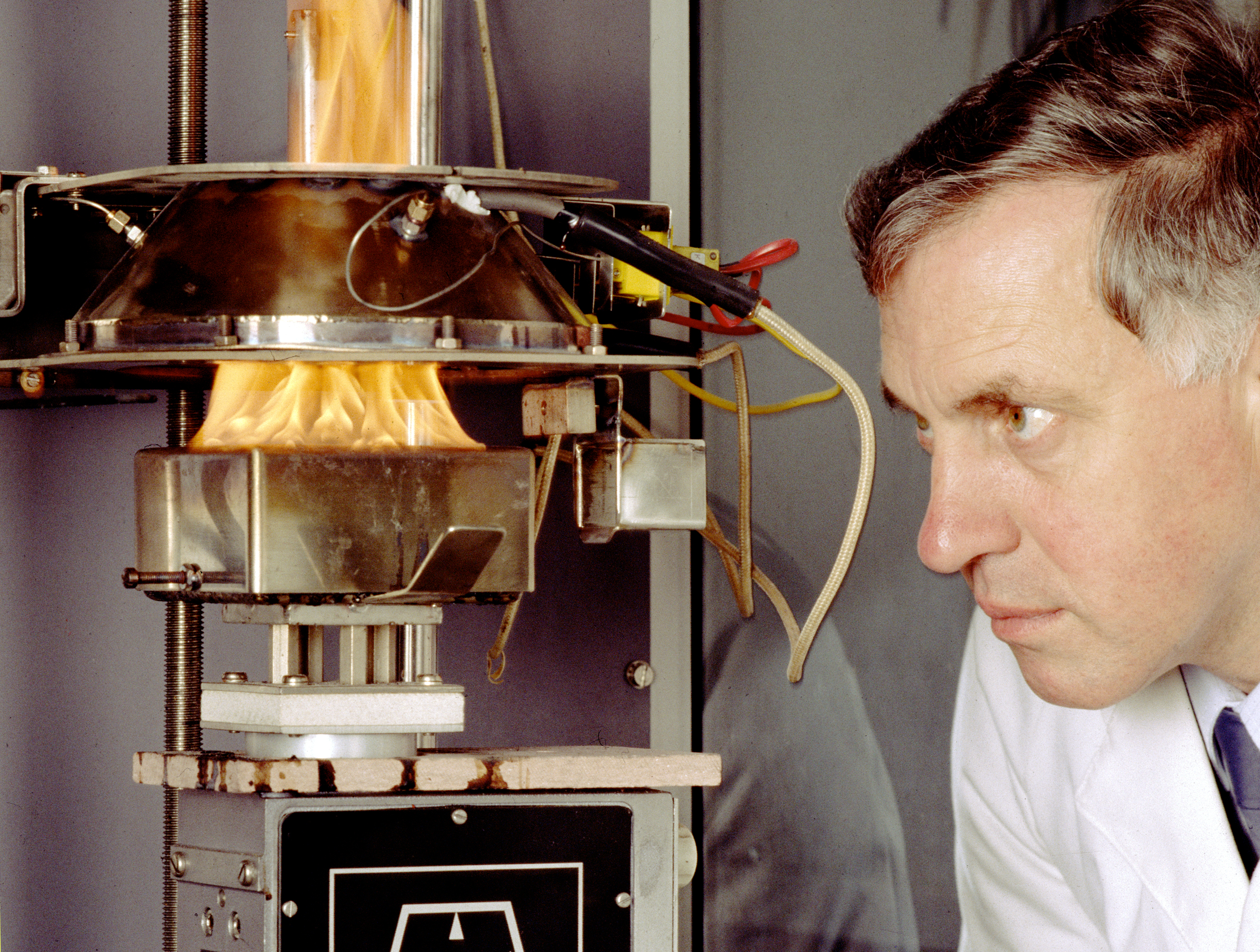
Cone calorimeter stage while in use. Note that thermoplastic walls surround the apparatus, providing safe separation between the flame and the scientist.

A cone calorimeter is an instrument used to study the behavior of fire in small samples of condensed phase materials. It is widely used in the field of fire safety engineering and in oxygen consumption calorimetry.

The instrument gathers data about the ignition time, mass loss, combustion products, heat release rate, and other parameters associated with the sample's burning properties. The measurement of the heat release rate is based on Huggett's principle that the gross heat of combustion of any organic material is directly related to the amount of oxygen required for combustion. Its name comes from the conical shape of a radiant heater incorporated into the instrument that can produce a nearly uniform heat flux over the surface of the sample under study.

== Development ==
In the 1960s, researchers at the National Institute of Standards and Technology (NIST) determined that the heat release from a fire directly related to the growth rate of a fire and was thus a major factor in the fire's risk to life and property. However, prior devices used to measure heat release typically estimated the heat release of a fire by measuring the increase in temperature of ambient air flowing past the combusting material and these measurements of heat release were often inaccurate, so a more reliable device was desired.

Through the 1960s and 1970s, research efforts developed a more accurate method for estimating heat release. In 1977, William Parker published research that demonstrated that heat release during combustion was roughly constant per unit of oxygen consumed for a variety of fuels. By measuring the oxygen consumed during combustion, one could estimate heat release of a fire; this method is now termed oxygen consumption calorimetry. This finding was a rediscovery of a method first identified in 1917 by W. M. Thornston, whose research similarly found that during combustion of organic liquids and gases, a consistent amount of heat was released per unit mass of oxygen consumed. Clayton Huggett later provided a rigorous proof of concept in his 1980 paper to suggest oxygen consumption calorimetry was a significantly more accurate method for estimating heat release than prior methods.

Following the development of oxygen consumption calorimetry, in 1982, Vytenis Babrauskas and colleagues at the Center for Fire Research built the first cone calorimeter. The cone calorimeter was quickly realized as an important instrument for modern fire safety tests, being formally recognized in 1988 by an R&D 100 Award. The cone calorimeter is used today for both regulatory and research purposes.

== Use ==
The cone calorimeter is used in several standard models to evaluate different aspects of flammable materials. As a reduced-scale apparatus, the size of the instrument typically limits the size of samples to less than 100 mm^{2}. Compared to previous devices used in calorimetry, the cone calorimeter produces more reliable data, but must be scaled up to reflect actual fire safety considerations.

The instrument is used by encasing a small sample in aluminium foil, wool, and a retainer frame that is ignited below an exhaust hood. A conical heater is placed in between in order for materials to combust. The cone-shaped Inconel heating element provides a controllable radiant flux onto the sample, turning electricity into heat not unlike an electric toaster or oven. The flammability of a sample can be characterized as a function of heat flux onto a sample. The conical heater is open in its center, allowing products of combustion to flow upwards into an exhaust duct. Soot can be collected in the bottom of the frame for gravimetric analysis.

Ventilation is also a very important part of the device, as well as the electrical power to run the conical heater. A small water supply is necessary to cool and regulate the heat in the system of the device. Since temperature and pressure are being evaluated, two different measurement tools are needed in the exhaust tube. Gas samples, smoke measurements, and soot collections are also acquired using this device.

== See also ==
- Flammability
- Flammability diagram
- Fire test
- Fire-safe polymers
- Fire protection engineering
