= Polybutylene terephthalate =

Names
- IUPAC name Poly(oxy-1,4-butanediyloxycarbonyl-1,4-phenylenecarbonyl)

Identifiers
CAS Number	24968-12-5
ChemSpider	none

Properties
Chemical formula	(C_{12}H_{12}O_{4})_{n}
Melting point	223 °C (433 °F; 496 K)
- Except where otherwise noted, data are given for materials in their standard state (at 25 °C [77 °F], 100 kPa). verify (what is ?) Infobox references

Polybutylene terephthalate (PBT) is a thermoplastic engineering polymer that is used as an insulator in the electrical and electronics industries. It is a thermoplastic (semi-)crystalline polymer, and a type of polyester. PBT resists solvents, shrinks very little during forming, is mechanically strong, is heat-resistant up to 150 °C (or 200 °C with glass-fibre reinforcement), and can be treated with flame retardants to make it noncombustible. It was developed by Britain's Imperial Chemical Industries (ICI).

PBT is closely related to other thermoplastic polyesters. Compared to PET (polyethylene terephthalate), PBT has slightly lower strength and rigidity, slightly better impact resistance, and a slightly lower glass transition temperature. PBT and PET are sensitive to hot water above 60 °C (140 °F). PBT and PET need UV protection if used outdoors, and most grades of these polyesters are flammable, although additives can be used to improve both UV and flammability properties.

PBT is produced by the polymerization of 1,4-butanediol and terephthalic acid.

== Applications ==
Polybutylene terephthalate is used for housings in electrical engineering, but also in automotive construction as plug connectors and in households for example in showerheads or irons. It is also found processed into toothbrush fibers and false eyelashes and is used in the keycaps of some high-end computer keyboards because the texture is highly resistant to wear and the plastic is less vulnerable to ultraviolet degradation and discoloration than the conventional ABS alternative.

PBT can also be made into yarn. This has a natural stretch similar to Lycra and can be incorporated into sportswear. Due to its chlorine resistance it is commonly found in swimwear. Further, recent studies have shown that PBT has superior UV properties to PET based fabrics such as T400.

PBT, especially glass fibre grades, can be effectively fire-retarded with halogen-free products. Phosphorus-based flame retardant systems are used in these fire-safe polymers and are based on aluminium diethyl phosphinate and synergists. They are designed to meet UL 94 flammability tests as well as Glow Wire Ignition Tests (GWIT), Glow Wire Flammability Test (GWFI) and Comparative Tracking Index (CTI). Main applications are in the electrical and electronics (E&E) industry.

== Producers ==
- Novaduran (Mitsubishi Chemical Group)
- Celanex (Celanese)
- Crastin (Celanese)
- Anjacom (almaak international GmbH)
- Arnite (ENVALIOR)
- Duranex PBT (Polyplastics)
- Dylox (Hoffmann + Voss GmbH)
- Kebater (BARLOG plastics GmbH)
- Later (LATI)
- Pocan (ENVALIOR)
- Precite (AKRO)
- Rialox (RIA-Polymers GmbH)
- Schuladur (A. Schulman)
- Ultradur (BASF)
- Valox (Sabic Innovative Plastics)
- Vestodur (Evonik Industries AG)
- Badadur PBT (Bada AG)
- Bergadur (PolyOne Th. Bergmann GmbH)
- Longlite (Chang Chun Plastics Co Ltd)
- Ensinger
