= Nylon 66 =

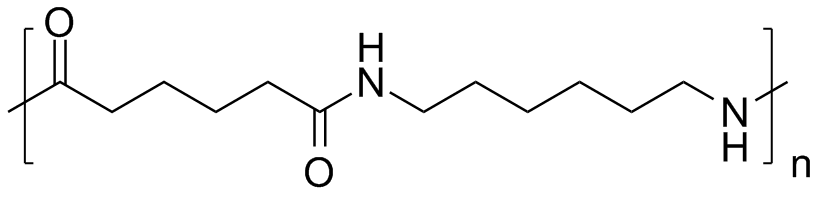

Names
- IUPAC name Poly[imino(1,6-dioxohexamethylene) iminohexamethylene]
- Systematic IUPAC name Poly(azanediyladipoylazanediylhexane-1,6-diyl)
- Other names Poly(hexamethylene adipamide),Poly(N,N'-hexamethyleneadipinediamide), Maranyl, Ultramid, Zytel, Akromid, Durethan, Frianyl, Vydyne

Identifiers
| CAS Number | 32131-17-2 |
| ChemSpider | None |
| ECHA InfoCard | 100.130.739 |
| PubChem CID | 3032893 |
| CompTox Dashboard (EPA) | DTXSID6027973 |

Properties
| Chemical formula | (C_{12}H_{22}N_{2}O_{2})_{n} |
| Density | 1.140 g/ml (Zytel) |
| Melting point | 264 °C (507 °F) |

Hazards
- Occupational safety and health (OHS/OSH)
| Main hazards | Non-hazardous |
- GHS labelling
| Pictograms | (GHS07: Exclamation mark) |
| Signal word | Warning |
| Flash point | 305.5 °C (581.9 °F; 578.6 K) |
| Autoignition temperature | 485.1 °C (905.2 °F; 758.2 K) |
- Safety data sheet (SDS)
- Except where otherwise noted, data are given for materials in their standard state (at 25 °C [77 °F], 100 kPa). Infobox references

Nylon 66 (loosely written nylon 6-6, nylon 6/6, nylon 6,6, or nylon 6:6) is a type of polyamide or nylon. It, and nylon 6, are the two most common for textile and plastic industries. Nylon 66 is made of two monomers each containing six carbon atoms, hexamethylenediamine and adipic acid, which give nylon 66 its name. Aside from its superior physical characteristics, nylon 66 is attractive because its precursors are inexpensive.

== Synthesis and manufacturing ==
Hexamethylenediamine (top) and adipic acid (bottom), the monomers used for polycondensation of Nylon 66

Nylon 66 is synthesized by polycondensation of hexamethylenediamine and adipic acid. Equivalent amounts of hexamethylenediamine and adipic acid are combined in water. In the original implementation, the resulting ammonium/carboxylate salt was isolated and then heated either in batches or continuously to induce polycondensation.

n(HOOC−(CH_{2})_{4}−COOH) + n(H_{2}N−(CH_{2})_{6}−NH_{2}) → [−OC−(CH_{2})_{4}−CO−NH−(CH_{2})_{6}−NH−]_{n} + (2n-1) H_{2}O

Removing water drives the reaction toward polymerization through the formation of amide bonds from the acid and amine functions. Alternatively, the polymerization is conducted on a concentrated aqueous mixture formed of hexamethylenediamine and adipic acid.

It can either be extruded and granulated at this point or directly spun into fibers by extrusion through a spinneret (a small metal plate with fine holes) and cooling to form filaments.

== Applications ==
In 2011 worldwide production was two million tons. At that time, fibers consumed just over half of production and engineering resins the rest. It is not used in film applications as it cannot be biaxially oriented. Fiber markets represented 55% of the 2010 demand with engineering thermoplastics being the remainder.

Nylon 66 is frequently used when high mechanical strength, rigidity, good stability under heat and/or chemical resistance are required. It is used in fibers for textiles and carpets and molded parts. For textiles, fibers are sold under various brands, for example Nilit brands or the Cordura brand for luggage, but it is also used in airbags, apparel, and for carpet fibres under the Ultron brand. Nylon 66 lends itself well to make 3D structural objects, mostly by injection molding. It has broad use in automotive applications; these include "under the hood" parts such as radiator end tanks, rocker covers, air intake manifolds, and oil pans, as well as numerous other structural parts such as hinges, and ball bearing cages. Other applications include electro-insulating elements, pipes, profiles, various machine parts, zip ties, conveyor belts, hoses, polymer-framed weapons, and the outer layer of turnout blankets. Nylon 66 is also a popular guitar nut material.

Nylon 66, especially glass fiber reinforced grades, can be effectively fire retardant with halogen-free products. Phosphorus-based flame retardant systems are used in these fire-safe polymers and are based on aluminium diethyl phosphinate and synergists. They are designed to meet UL 94 flammability tests as well as Glow Wire Ignition Tests (GWIT), Glow Wire Flammability Test (GWFI) and Comparative Tracking Index (CTI). Its main applications are in the electrical and electronics (E&E) industry.

== See also ==
- Nylon rope trick
