= Flame spread =

Flame spread, or surface burning characteristics rating_{,} is a ranking derived by laboratory standard test methodology of a material's propensity to burn rapidly and spread flames. There are several standardized methods of determining flame spread,

== Test methods ==
NFPA 255 Standard Method of Test of Surface Burning Characteristics of Building Materials, utilizes ASTM E84 Standard Test Method for Surface Burning Characteristics of Building Materials. This test method measures flame growth on the underside of a horizontal test specimen, using the Steiner tunnel test. The result is derivation of a Flame Spread Index (FSI), which is a non-dimensional number which is placed on a relative scale in which asbestos-cement board has a value of 0, and red oak wood has 100. Evaluation of a FSI by this test method does not provide a good understanding of how fire would propagate in full scale, such as in a room, for some materials. In particular, the results for materials that drip, such as thermoplastics, are not indicative of the fire hazard as installed on walls and ceilings because they tend to melt and drip away from the underside of the horizontal ceiling in the test chamber. Because the test method measures how far down the test chamber the fire progressed, this type of "lack of fire progression" provides a misleading FSI. In order to address such restrictions, a new test method was derived, NFPA 286 Standard Methods of Fire Tests for Evaluating Contribution of Wall and Ceiling Interior Finish to Room Fire Growth.

NFPA 286 Standard Methods of Fire Tests for Evaluating Contribution of Wall and Ceiling Interior Finish to Room Fire Growth, measures flame spread in a room configuration, including fire spread along walls, ceilings, and combinations of both. This method is more indicative of real world fire hazards, and is preferred over NFPA 255, but is more expensive. Also, test results for heat, smoke, and combustion product release from NFPA 286 are suitable for use as input into fire models for performance-based design, whereas results from NFPA 255 are not. Flame spread rating number is not the rate at which the flame actually spreads along the surface and is not an indication of the fire resistance of the material.

UL 723 (ASTM E84) Test for Surface Burning Characteristics of Building Materials

ASTM E84 - 15a Standard Test Method for Surface Burning Characteristics of Building Materials

UL 94 Standard for Tests for Flammability of Plastic Materials for Parts in Devices and Appliances

== Use ==
The Life Safety Code (NFPA 101) and Section 803.1 of the International Building Code limit finishes for interior walls and ceilings to materials in three classes (A, B, or C, with A being the lowest flame spread and C being the highest) and gives greater restrictions for certain rooms:

Class	Flame Spread Index
A	0-25
B	26-75
C	76-200

In order to meet classification in any of the three categories, the smoke developed index cannot exceed 450.
