= Melamine cyanurate =

Melamine-cyanuric acid complex
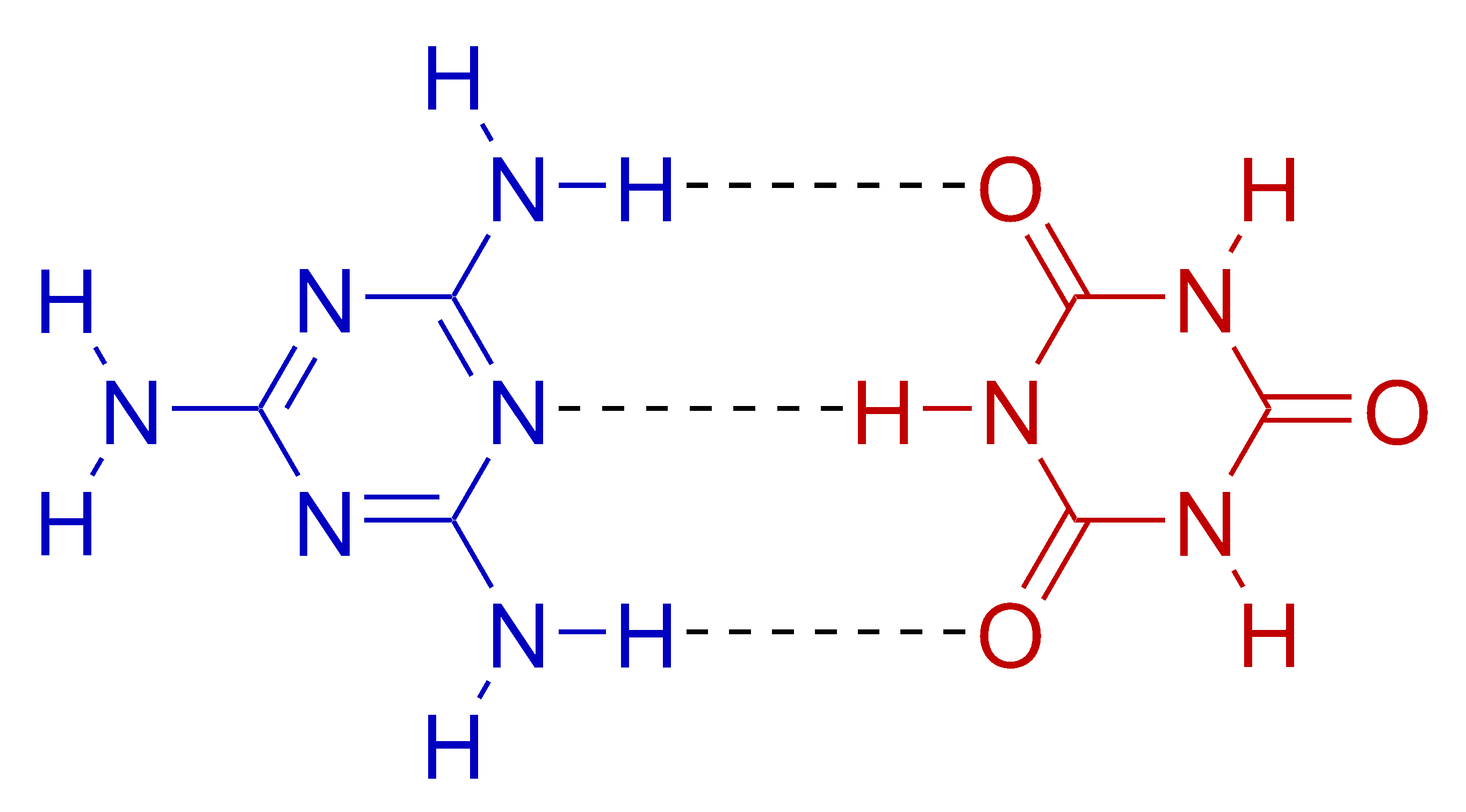

Names
- Preferred IUPAC name 1,3,5-Triazinane-2,4,6-trione—1,3,5-triazine-2,4,6-triamine (1/1)
- Other names Melamine–cyanuric acid compound, melamine–cyanuric acid adduct, melamine cyanurate, melamine isocyanurate

Identifiers
CAS Number	37640-57-6; 70371-20-9
3D model (JSmol)	Interactive image
ChemSpider	84141
ECHA InfoCard	100.048.687
MeSH	melamine+cyanurate
PubChem CID	93198
CompTox Dashboard (EPA)	DTXSID3068043
- InChI: InChI=1S/C3H6N6.C3H3N3O3/c4-1-7-2(5)9-3(6)8-1;7-1-4-2(8)6-3(9)5-1/h(H6,4,5,6,7,8,9);(H3,4,5,6,7,8,9) Key: ZQKXQUJXLSSJCH-UHFFFAOYSA-N
- SMILES: c1(nc(nc(n1)N)N)N.c1(=O)[nH]c(=O)[nH]c(=O)[nH]1

Properties
Chemical formula	C_{6}H_{9}N_{9}O_{3} (C_{3}H_{6}N_{6}·C_{3}H_{3}N_{3}O_{3})
Molar mass	255.19 g/mol
Solubility in water	none
- Except where otherwise noted, data are given for materials in their standard state (at 25 °C [77 °F], 100 kPa). verify (what is ?) Infobox references

Melamine cyanurate, also known as melamine–cyanuric acid adduct or melamine–cyanuric acid complex, is a crystalline complex formed from a 1:1 mixture of melamine and cyanuric acid. The substance is not a salt despite its non-systematic name melamine cyanurate. The complex is held together by an extensive two-dimensional network of hydrogen bonds between the two compounds, reminiscent of the guanine–cytosine base pairs found in DNA. Melamine cyanurate forms spoke-like crystals from aqueous solutions and has been implicated as a causative agent for toxicity seen in the Chinese protein export contamination and the 2007 pet food recall. This complex is cited as an example of supramolecular chemistry.

== Uses ==
Melamine cyanurate is used as a flame retardant, most commonly in polybutylene terephthalate (PBT), polyamide 6 (nylon 6) and polyamide 6,6 (nylon 6:6). It is also used to fireproof in polyester fabrics.

== Toxicity ==
It has been considered to be more toxic than either melamine or cyanuric acid alone.

LD_{50} in rats and mice (ingested):

- 4.1 g/kg – Melamine cyanurate
- 6.0 g/kg – Melamine
- 7.7 g/kg – Cyanuric acid

A toxicology study conducted after recent pet food recalls concluded that the combination of melamine and cyanuric acid in diet does lead to acute kidney injury in cats. A 2008 study produced similar experimental results in rats and characterized the melamine and cyanuric acid in contaminated pet food from the 2007 outbreak.

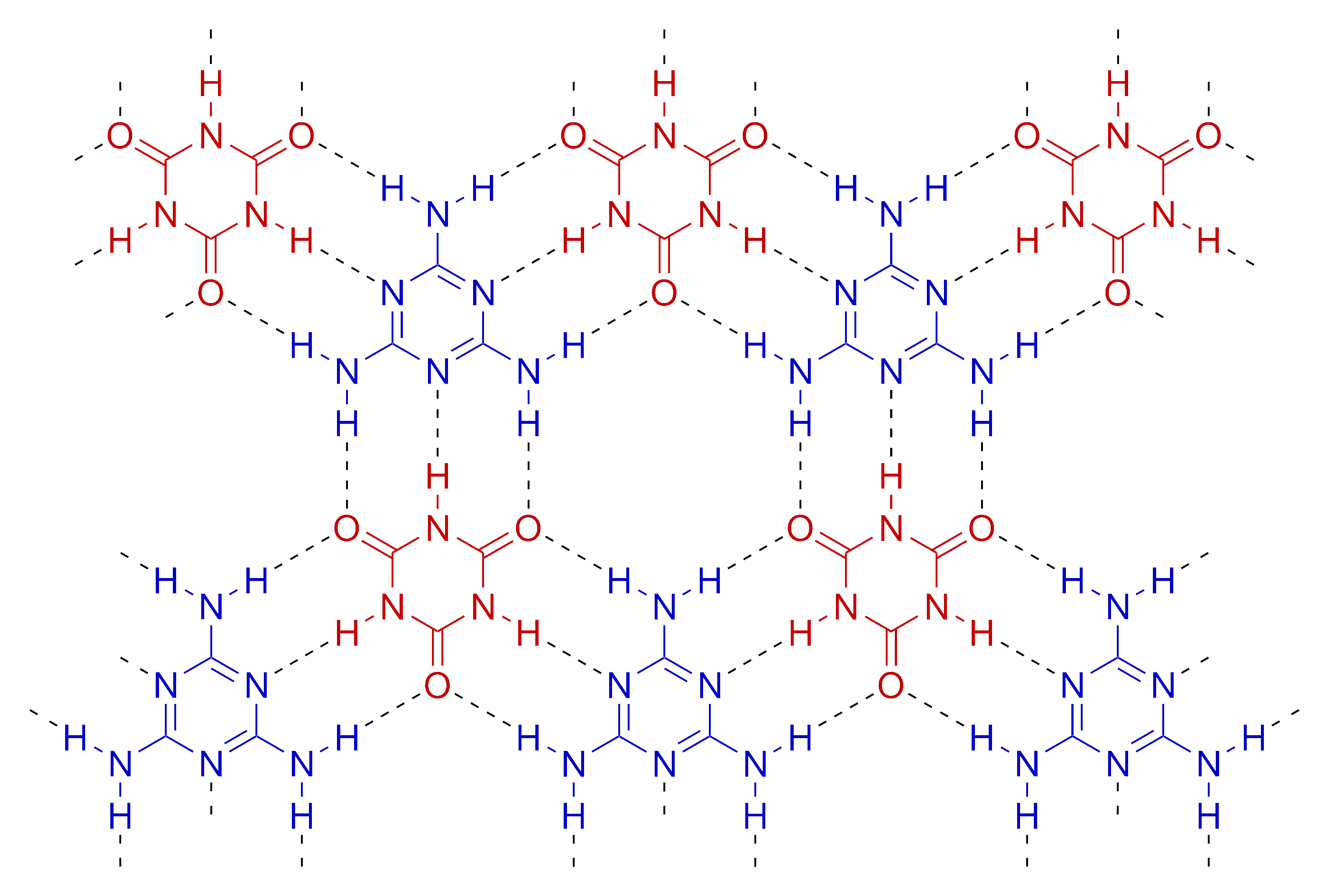
Section of the extensive two-dimensional hydrogen bond network (dashed) between melamine (blue) and cyanuric acid (red)

== See also ==
- 1,3,5-Triazine
- Hydrogen bonding
