= Pentabromobenzyl acrylate =

Names
- IUPAC name (2,3,4,5,6-pentabromophenyl)methyl prop-2-enoate

Identifiers
CAS Number	59447-55-1
3D model (JSmol)	Interactive image
ChemSpider	91304
ECHA InfoCard	100.056.134
EC Number	261-767-7
PubChem CID	101059
UNII	K55L5VE7PP
CompTox Dashboard (EPA)	DTXSID9052719
- InChI: InChI=1S/C10H5Br5O2/c1-2-5(16)17-3-4-6(11)8(13)10(15)9(14)7(4)12/h2H,1,3H2 Key: GRKDVZMVHOLESV-UHFFFAOYSA-N
- SMILES: C=CC(=O)OCC1=C(C(=C(C(=C1Br)Br)Br)Br)Br

Properties
Chemical formula	C_{10}H_{5}Br_{5}O_{2}
Molar mass	556.668 g·mol^{−1}

Hazards
- GHS labelling
Pictograms	(GHS07: Exclamation mark)
Signal word	Warning
Hazard statements	H319, H413
Precautionary statements	P264+P265, P273, P280, P305+P351+P338, P337+P317, P501
- Except where otherwise noted, data are given for materials in their standard state (at 25 °C [77 °F], 100 kPa). Infobox references

Pentabromobenzyl acrylate (abbreviated as PBB-Acr) is an organic compound used as a reactive flame retardant in polybutylene terephthalate, polyethylene terephthalate, and acrylonitrile butadiene styrene polymers.
