= Smoke-developed index =

Smoke-developed index (abbreviated SDI) is a measure of the concentration of smoke a material emits as it burns. Like the Flame Spread Index, it is based on an arbitrary scale in which asbestos-cement board has a value of 0, and red oak wood has 100. The SDI is measured using a horizontal test specimen, according to the Steiner tunnel test protocol.

The ASTM standard E84 defines a standard test method for surface flame spread and smoke density measurements. A smoke-developed index of less than 450 is required by IBC section 803.1 at interior walls and ceilings for all surface materials except trim.

== See also ==
- Steiner tunnel test
- Limiting oxygen index
