= IUPAC Color Books =

Books published by the International Union of Pure and Applied Chemistry

The IUPAC Color Books are a collection of books produced by the International Union of Pure and Applied Chemistry (IUPAC), containing its complete list of definitions. Although the colors are not the formal names of these books, they are commonly referred to simply by color by chemists. The set consists of eight volumes: Green, Red, Blue, Purple, Orange, Silver, White, and Gold.

== Blue Book ==
The Blue Book, formally titled Nomenclature of Organic Chemistry, is a collection of recommendations on organic chemical nomenclature. Updates are published at irregular intervals. A full edition was published in 1979, an abridged and updated version of which was published in 1993 as A Guide to IUPAC Nomenclature of Organic Compounds. Both of these are now out-of-print in their paper versions, but are available free of charge in electronic versions. After the release of a draft version for public comment in 2004 and the publication of several revised sections in the journal Pure and Applied Chemistry, a fully revised version was published in print in 2013.

== Gold Book ==
The front cover of the second edition of the Compendium of Chemical Terminology.

The Gold Book, formally titled Compendium of Chemical Terminology, contains internationally accepted definitions for terms in chemistry. Work on the first edition was initiated by Victor Gold, thus spawning its informal name.

The first edition was published in 1987 (ISBN 0-63201-765-1). The second (ISBN 0-86542-684-8), edited by A. D. McNaught and A. Wilkinson, was published in 1997. A slightly expanded version is also freely searchable online. Translations have also been published in French, Spanish and Polish.

== Green Book ==
The Green Book, formally titled Quantities, Units and Symbols in Physical Chemistry, is a compilation of terms and symbols widely used in the field of physical chemistry. It also includes a table of physical constants, tables listing the properties of elementary particles, chemical elements, and nuclides, and information about conversion factors that are commonly used in physical chemistry.

The most recent is the third edition (ISBN 978-0-85404-433-7), originally published by IUPAC in 2007. A second printing of the third edition was released in 2008; this printing made several minor revisions to the 2007 text. A third printing of the third edition was released in 2011. The text of the third printing is identical to that of the second printing.

== Orange Book ==
The Orange Book, formally titled Compendium of Analytical Nomenclature, contains internationally accepted definitions for terms in analytical chemistry. It has traditionally been published in an orange cover.

Although the book is described as the "Definitive Rules", there have been three editions published; the first in 1978 (ISBN 0-08022-008-8), the second in 1987 (ISBN 0-63201-907-7) and the third in 1998 (ISBN 0-86542-615-5). The third edition is also available online. A Catalan translation has also been published (1987, ISBN 84-7283-121-3).

== Purple Book ==
The Purple Book, formally titled Compendium of Macromolecular Terminology and Nomenclature, contains the nomenclature of polymers. The first edition was first published in 1991. The second and latest edition was published in December 2008 and is also available for download.

== Red Book ==
The Red Book, formally titled Nomenclature of Inorganic Chemistry, is a collection of recommendations on inorganic chemical nomenclature. It is published at irregular intervals, with the latest full edition published in 2005, in both paper and electronic versions.

Published editions
Release year	Title	Publisher	ISBN
2005	Recommendations 2005 (Red Book)	RSC Publishing	0-85404-438-8
2001	Recommendations 2000 (Red Book II) (supplement)	RSC Publishing	0-85404-487-6
1990	Recommendations 1990 (Red Book I)	Blackwell	0-632-02494-1
1971	Definitive Rules 1970	Butterworth	0-408-70168-4
1959	1957 Rules	Butterworth	-
1940/1941	1940 Rules	Scientific journals	-

== Silver Book ==
The Silver Book, is formally titled Compendium of Terminology and Nomenclature of Properties in Clinical Laboratory Sciences. The original Silver Book was a publication of the IUPAC, but the second edition was published by the Royal Society of Chemistry.

== White Book ==
The White Book, formally titled Biochemical Nomenclature and Related Documents (1992), contains definitions pertaining to biochemical research, compiled jointly by IUPAC and the International Union of Biochemistry and Molecular Biology.

== See also ==
- International Union of Pure and Applied Chemistry nomenclature
- IUPAC polymer nomenclature
