= AuTx =

Synthetic fibre

AuTx is a terpolyaramide fibre that was developed from 2005 to 2012 by Alchemie Group.

== History ==
The brand name was created by Haslen Back that led the team with the assistance of Kamenskvolokno and Dr Igor Tikhanov at NPO Termotex. It is based on Russian aramid 29.4tex fibre that was modified under program with the US DoD, PEO Soldier led by Dr James Zheng to lighten the weight of the IOTV body armour vest. By 2012 the fragmentation resistant panels made from AuTx were 27% lighter than from Kevlar. A terpolyaramide fibre at 60Tex is now made in the USA by DuPont and sold under the Kevlar EXO brand.

AuTx-FR is a fire-resistant fibre with high thermal stability and a high LOI, and strength at elevated temperatures with minimal thermal degradation. The process of forming AuTx-FR fibres allows the LOI to be varied between 40 and 70, with a trade-off for lesser strength the higher the LOI number is.

The history of AuTx started in 1976 with the creation of the first Russian para-aramid fibres under the name SVM (Super High modulus Fibre). The process of fibre forming was principally different from those used while forming Kevlar and Twaron aramid fibres. The SVM fibre had high strength (190-220 cN/tex), high modulus (75-100 GPa), and high elongation at break (3,0-4,0%). This fibre was used in high-strength lightweight composites and as a fabric in the creation of first flexible Russian bullet-proof vests.

During the next 20 years, SVM-based fabric was the main material for flexible anti-fragmentation and bullet-proof vests and helmets for the Russian military and other governmental and private security organizations. Hundreds of thousands of vests and helmets were supplied, and some of them are in use today. The next generation of Russian aramid fibre was created and put into large-scale production in 1989 for composite applications under the trade name of ARMOS. The main features of this fibre were its long lifetime under load (more than 15 years), high modulus (110-160 GPa) and produced without any sizing.

The current generation of fibres that have become the base for AuTx materials appeared in 1997 under the trade name RUSAR (an abbreviation for Russian Aramid). This fibre has high strength (230-270 cN/tex for AuTx WE and 300+ cN/tex for AuTx DWE), high modulus (100-140 GPa) and elongation at break at (2,6-3%) and is extremely environmentally resilient.

AuTx fibres and fabrics are based on RUSAR fibre technology. AuTx is available in rovings, woven and non-woven textiles and composites used for ballistic protection or structural applications where strength to weight ratios are a premium.
