= Nilit =

Nylon 6.6 manufacturer

Nilit Ltd.
- Type: Private
- Industry: Nylon 6.6
- Founded: 1969; 57 years ago
- Headquarters: Migdal HaEmek, Israel
- Key people: Michael P Levi, Chairman; Ilan Melamed, General Manager
- Products: Nylon 6.6 yarns
- Number of employees: 1200 (2017)
- Website: www.nilit.com

NILIT Ltd. (Hebrew: נילית בע"מ) is a privately owned, international manufacturer of nylon 6.6 (polyamide) fibers headquartered in Migdal HaEmek, Israel. NILIT specializes in the polymerization, spinning and texturing of nylon 6.6 yarns for textile applications.

== History ==
NILIT Ltd. was founded in 1969 by Ennio Levi, a man who immigrated to Israel with his family from Italy. Construction of the plant began in 1971 in Migdal HaEmek, Israel and production began in 1974, making NILIT the first Israeli manufacturer of nylon. In 1978, NILIT began polymerization.

In 1981, NILIT began salification.

In 1988, NILIT's 5 denier yarn entered the Guinness Book of World Records as the world's finest nylon yarn.

In 1995, NILIT founded Euronil Thermoplastics Compounds SpA in Rho Milan, Italy – its first manufacturing facility outside of Israel. Euronil began manufacturing two years later, specializing in flame retardant thermoplastics and internally lubricated plastics. It was later renamed NILIT Plastics Europe S.r.l.

In 1996, Sara Lee Hosiery and NILIT signed a joint venture (today named H.N.F. Ltd – Hanesbrands Nilit Fibers) to produce nylon 6.6 POY yarns for the Hanesbrands apparel line in NILIT's Israeli manufacturing facility. In 2006, Hanesbrands was spun off from Sara Lee to become a standalone, publicly held company.

In 2001, Unifi, Inc., a yarn processor, and NILIT signed a joint venture (named U.N.F. Industries Ltd. – Unifi Nilit Fibers) to produce nylon 6.6 POY yarns for texturing in NILIT's Israeli manufacturing facility.

In 2004, Pompea SpA and NILIT signed a joint venture (named P.N.F Ltd). In 2006, they together initiated a new POY production line located in NILIT's Israeli manufacturing facility.

In 2006, NILIT began a series of acquisitions of manufacturing facilities worldwide. The first was the fibers business of Invista Apparel Europe in 2006. In 2007, NILIT acquired Frisetta Polymer in Germany. The company was then renamed NILIT Plastics Europe GmbH & Co. KG. Finally, in 2009, NILIT acquired Nylstar in Martinsville, Virginia, United States, and renamed the company NILIT America, Inc.

At the same time, NILIT founded two manufacturing facilities in China. It established NILIT Nylon Technologies (Suzhou) Co., Ltd. which began texturing yarns in Suzhou, Jiangsu, China in 2008. A year later, NILIT (Suzhou) Plastics Engineering Co., Ltd. began compounding thermoplastics. In 2012, NILIT launched its POY spinning plant in China and in 2013 the official inauguration ceremony for both the spinning and compounding thermoplastics sites in Suzhou, China took place. In 2013 NILIT started Texturing and covering in Brazil.

In 2014, NILIT invested almost $7.9 million (BRL 30 million) in a major INVISTA Nylon manufacturing plant in Americana, Brazil, making that nation one of its major production centers. Yarns produced there are made locally and include a range of high-performance and smart yarns, and sold primarily into the Brazilian market.

In 2017, the company sold its Nylon Compounding Division to Celanese Corporation.

== Products ==
NILIT Fibers produces fine, super fine and mid-denier yarns. These yarns are marketed under many brand names, including: NILIT Heat, NILIT Innergy, NILIT EcoCare, NILIT Black Diamond, NILIT Britex, NILIT Colorwise, NILIT Duelle, NILIT Pastelle, NILIT Arafelle, NILIT BodyFresh, NILIT Aquarius, NILIT Eversheer and NILIT Softex. In addition, NILIT is licensed to manufacture TACTEL, SUPPLEX and CORDURA fibers. End uses of these yarns include hosiery, socks, intimate apparel, bodywear and activewear.

== Global operations ==
NILIT operates in more than 70 countries. It has manufacturing facilities in Israel, Brazil, China and the United States. NILIT employs 1200 people worldwide.

NILIT is privately owned. It is run by Michael P. Levi who manages the Levi family companies, which include NILIT and MCA Ltd., the sole importer and distributor of Fiat, Lancia, Alfa Romeo, Abarth, Iveco and Subaru in Israel.

== See also ==
- Economy of Israel
- Textile manufacturing
