= Fire-safe polymers =

Polymers resistant to degradation at high temperatures

Fire-safe polymers are polymers that are resistant to degradation at high temperatures. There is need for fire-resistant polymers in the construction of small, enclosed spaces such as skyscrapers, boats, and airplane cabins. In these tight spaces, ability to escape in the event of a fire is compromised, increasing fire risk. In fact, some studies report that about 20% of victims of airplane crashes are killed not by the crash itself but by ensuing fires. Fire-safe polymers also find application as adhesives in aerospace materials, insulation for electronics, and in military materials such as canvas tenting.

Some fire-safe polymers naturally exhibit an intrinsic resistance to decomposition, while others are synthesized by incorporating fire-resistant additives and fillers. Current research in developing fire-safe polymers is focused on modifying various properties of the polymers such as ease of ignition, rate of heat release, and the evolution of smoke and toxic gases. Standard methods for testing polymer flammability vary among countries; in the United States common fire tests include the UL 94 small-flame test, the ASTM E 84 Steiner Tunnel, and the ASTM E 622 National Institute of Standards and Technology (NIST) smoke chamber. Research on developing fire-safe polymers with more desirable properties is concentrated at the University of Massachusetts Amherst and at the Federal Aviation Administration where a long-term research program on developing fire-safe polymers was begun in 1995. The Center for UMass/Industry Research on Polymers (CUMIRP) was established in 1980 in Amherst, MA as a concentrated cluster of scientists from both academia and industry for the purpose of polymer science and engineering research.

== History ==
=== Early history ===
Controlling the flammability of different materials has been a subject of interest since 450 B.C. when Egyptians attempted to reduce the flammability of wood by soaking it in potassium aluminum sulfate (alum). Between 450 B.C. and the early 20th century, other materials used to reduce the flammability of different materials included mixtures of alum and vinegar; clay and hair; clay and gypsum; alum, ferrous sulfate, and gypsum; and ammonium chloride, ammonium phosphate, borax, and various acids. These early attempts found application in reducing the flammability of wood for military materials, theater curtains, and other textiles, for example. Important milestones during this early work include the first patent for a mixture for controlling flammability issued to Obadiah Wyld in 1735, and the first scientific exploration of controlling flammability, which was undertaken by Joseph Louis Gay-Lussac in 1821.

=== Developments since WWII ===
Research on fire-retardant polymers was bolstered by the need for new types of synthetic polymers in World War II. The combination of a halogenated paraffin and antimony oxide was found to be successful as a fire retardant for canvas tenting. Synthesis of polymers, such as polyesters, with fire retardant monomers were also developed around this time. Incorporating flame-resistant additives into polymers became a common and relatively cheap way to reduce the flammability of polymers, while synthesizing intrinsically fire-resistant polymers has remained a more expensive alternative, although the properties of these polymers are usually more efficient at deterring combustion.

== Polymer combustion ==
=== General mechanistic scheme ===
Traditional polymers decompose under heat and produce combustible products; thus, they are able to originate and easily propagate fire (as shown in Figure 1).

Figure 1: A general scheme of polymer combustion.

The combustion process begins when heating a polymer yields volatile products. If these products are sufficiently concentrated, within the flammability limits, and at a temperature above the ignition temperature, then combustion proceeds. As long as the heat supplied to the polymer remains sufficient to sustain its thermal decomposition at a rate exceeding that required to feed the flame, combustion will continue.

=== Purpose and methods of fire-retardant systems ===
The purpose is to control heat below the critical level. To achieve this, one can create an endothermic environment, produce non-combustible products, or add chemicals that would remove fire-propagating radicals (H and OH), to name a few. These specific chemicals can be added into the polymer molecules permanently (see Intrinsically Fire-Resistant Polymers) or as additives and fillers (see Flame-Retardant Additives and Fillers).

=== Role of oxygen ===
Oxygen catalyzes the pyrolysis of polymers at low concentration and initiates oxidation at high concentration. Transition concentrations are different for different polymers. (e.g., polypropylene, between 5% and 15%). Additionally, polymers exhibit a structural-dependent relationship with oxygen. Some structures are intrinsically more sensitive to decomposition upon reaction with oxygen. The amount of access that oxygen has to the surface of the polymer also plays a role in polymer combustion. Oxygen is better able to interact with the polymer before a flame has actually been ignited.

=== Role of heating rate ===
In most cases, results from a typical heating rate (e.g. 10°C/min for mechanical thermal degradation studies) do not differ significantly from those obtained at higher heating rates. The extent of reaction can, however, be influenced by the heating rate. For example, some reactions may not occur with a low heating rate due to evaporation of the products.

=== Role of pressure ===
Volatile products are removed more efficiently under low pressure, which means the stability of the polymer might have been compromised. Decreased pressure also slows down decomposition of high boiling products.

== Intrinsically fire-resistant polymers ==
The polymers that are most efficient at resisting combustion are those that are synthesized as intrinsically fire-resistant. However, these types of polymers can be difficult as well as costly to synthesize. Modifying different properties of the polymers can increase their intrinsic fire-resistance; increasing rigidity or stiffness, the use of polar monomers, and/or hydrogen bonding between the polymer chains can all enhance fire-resistance.

=== Linear, single-stranded polymers with cyclic aromatic components ===
Most intrinsically fire-resistant polymers are made by incorporation of aromatic cycles or heterocycles, which lend rigidity and stability to the polymers. Polyimides, polybenzoxazoles (PBOs), polybenzimidazoles, and polybenzthiazoles (PBTs) are examples of polymers made with aromatic heterocycles (Figure 2).

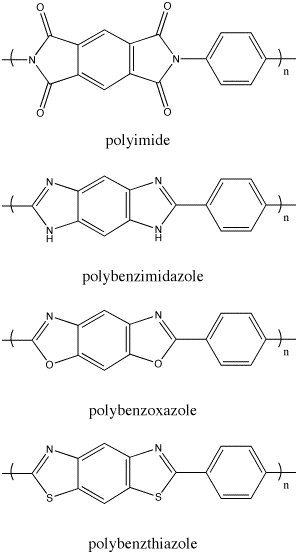
Figure 2: Different fire-resistant polymers made with aromatic heterocycles.

Polymers made with aromatic monomers have a tendency to condense into chars upon combustion, decreasing the amount of flammable gas that is released. Syntheses of these types of polymers generally employ prepolymers which are further reacted to form the fire-resistant polymers.

=== Ladder polymers ===
Ladder polymers are a subclass of polymers made with aromatic cycles or heterocycles. Ladder polymers generally have one of two types of general structures, as shown in Figure 3.

Figure 3: Two representative structures of different types of ladder polymers.

One type of ladder polymer links two polymer chains with periodic covalent bonds. In another type, the ladder polymer consists of a single chain that is double-stranded. Both types of ladder polymers exhibit good resistance to decomposition from heat because the chains do not necessarily fall apart if one covalent bond is broken. However, this makes the processing of ladder polymers difficult because they are not easily melted. These difficulties are compounded because ladder polymers are often highly insoluble.

=== Inorganic and semiorganic polymers ===
Inorganic and semiorganic polymers often employ silicon-nitrogen, boron-nitrogen, and phosphorus-nitrogen monomers. The non-burning characteristics of the inorganic components of these polymers contribute to their controlled flammability. For example, instead of forming toxic, flammable gasses in abundance, polymers prepared with incorporation of cyclotriphosphazene rings give a high char yield upon combustion. Polysialates (polymers containing frameworks of aluminum, oxygen, and silicon) are another type of inorganic polymer that can be thermally stable up to temperatures of 1300-1400 °C.

== Flame-retardant additives and fillers ==
Additives are divided into two basic types depending on the interaction of the additive and polymer. Reactive flame retardants are compounds that are chemically built into the polymer. They usually contain heteroatoms. Additive flame retardants, on the other hand, are compounds that are not covalently bound to the polymer; the flame retardant and the polymer are just physically mixed together. Only a few elements are being widely used in this field: aluminum, phosphorus, nitrogen, antimony, chlorine, bromine, and in specific applications magnesium, zinc and carbon. One prominent advantage of the flame retardants (FRs) derived from these elements is that they are relatively easy to manufacture. They are used in important quantities: in 2013, the world consumption of FRs amounted to around 1.8/2.1 Mio t for 2013 with sales of 4.9/5.2 billion USD. Market studies estimate FRs demand to rise between 5/7 % pa to 2.4/2.6 Mio t until 2016/2018 with estimated sales of 6.1/7.1 billion USD.

The most important flame retardants systems used act either in the gas phase where they remove the high energy radicals H and OH from the flame or in the solid phase, where they shield the polymer by forming a charred layer and thus protect the polymer from being attacked by oxygen and heat. Flame retardants based on bromine or chlorine, as well as a number of phosphorus compounds act chemically in the gas phase and are very efficient. Others only act in the condensed phase such as metal hydroxides (aluminum trihydrate, or ATH, magnesium hydroxide, or MDH, and boehmite), metal oxides and salts (zinc borate and zinc oxide, zinc hydroxystannate), as well as expandable graphite and some nanocomposites (see below). Phosphorus and nitrogen compounds are also effective in the condensed phase, and as they also may act in the gas phase, they are quite efficient flame retardants. Overviews of the main flame retardants families, their mode of action and applications are given in. Further handbooks on these topics are A good example for a very efficient phosphorus-based flame retardant system acting in the gas and condensed phases is aluminium diethyl phosphinate in conjunction with synergists such as melamine polyphosphate (MPP) and others. These phosphinates are mainly used to flame retard polyamides (PA) and polybutylene terephthalate (PBT) for flame retardant applications in electrical engineering/electronics (E&E).

=== Natural fiber-containing composites ===
Besides providing satisfactory mechanical properties and renewability, natural fibers are easier to obtain and much cheaper than man-made materials. Moreover, they are more environmentally friendly. Recent research focuses on application of different types of fire retardants during the manufacturing process as well as applications of fire retardants (especially intumescent coatings) at the finishing stage.

=== Nanocomposites ===
Nanocomposites have become a hotspot in the research of fire-safe polymers because of their relatively low cost and high flexibility for multifunctional properties. Gilman and colleagues did the pioneering work by demonstrating the improvement of fire-retardancy by having nanodispersed montmorillonite clay in the polymer matrix. Later, organomodified clays, TiO_{2} nanoparticles, silica nanoparticles, layered double hydroxides, carbon nanotubes and polyhedral silsesquioxanes were proved to work as well. Recent research has suggested that combining nanoparticles with traditional fire retardants (e.g., intumescents) or with surface treatment (e.g., plasma treatment) effectively decreases flammability.

=== Problems with additives and fillers ===
Although effective at reducing flammability, flame-retardant additives and fillers have disadvantages as well. Their poor compatibility, high volatility and other deleterious effects can change properties of polymers. Besides, addition of many fire-retardants produces soot and carbon monoxide during combustion. Halogen-containing materials cause even more concerns on environmental pollution.

== See also ==
- Plastics
- Fireproofing
- Phenol formaldehyde resin
- Pyrolysis
- Combustion
- Fire-retardant gel
- Fire test
