= IUPAC polymer nomenclature =

Standardized naming conventions for polymers

IUPAC Polymer Nomenclature are standardized naming conventions for polymers set by the International Union of Pure and Applied Chemistry (IUPAC) and described in their publication "Compendium of Polymer Terminology and Nomenclature", which is also known as the "Purple Book". Both the IUPAC and Chemical Abstracts Service (CAS) make similar naming recommendations for the naming of polymers.

== Basic Concepts ==
The terms polymer and macromolecule do not mean the same thing. A polymer is a substance composed of macromolecules. The latter usually have a range of molar masses (unit g mol^{−1}), the distributions of which are indicated by dispersity (Đ). It is defined as the ratio of the mass-average molar mass (M_{m}) to the number-average molar mass (M_{n}) i.e. Đ = M_{m}/M_{n}. Symbols for physical quantities or variables are in italic font but those representing units or labels are in roman font.

Polymer nomenclature usually applies to idealized representations meaning minor structural irregularities are ignored. A polymer can be named in one of two ways. Source-based nomenclature can be used when the monomer can be identified. Alternatively, more explicit structure-based nomenclature can be used when the polymer structure is proven. Where there is no confusion, some traditional names are also acceptable.

Whatever method is used, all polymer names have the prefix poly, followed by enclosing marks around the rest of the name. The marks are used in the order: {[( )]}. Locants indicate the position of structural features, e.g., poly(4-chlorostyrene). If the name is one word and has no locants, then the enclosing marks are not essential, but they should be used when there might be confusion, e.g., poly(chlorostyrene) is a polymer whereas polychlorostyrene might be a small, multi-substituted molecule. End-groups are described with α- and ω-, e.g., α-chloro-ω-hydroxy-polystyrene.

== Source-Based Nomenclature ==
=== Homopolymers ===
Homopolymers are named using the name of the real or assumed monomer (the ‘source’) from which it is derived, e.g., poly(methyl methacrylate). Monomers can be named using IUPAC recommendations, or well-established traditional names. Should ambiguity arise, class names can be added.

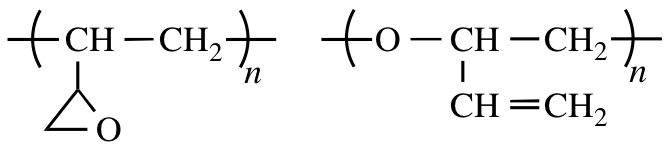
polyalkylene:vinyloxirane (left) and polyether:vinyloxirane (right)

For example, the source-based name poly(vinyloxirane) could correspond to either of the structures shown. To clarify, the polymer is named using the polymer class name followed by a colon and the name of the monomer, i.e., class name:monomer name. Thus on the left and right, respectively, are polyalkylene:vinyloxirane and polyether:vinyloxirane.

=== Copolymers ===
The structure of a copolymer can be described using the most appropriate of the connectives shown in Table 1. These are written in italic font.

Qualifiers for copolymers
Copolymer	Qualifier	Example
unspecified	co (C)	poly(styrene-co-isoprene)
statistical	stat (C)	poly[isoprene-stat-(methyl methacrylate)]
random	ran (C)	poly[(methyl methacrylate)-ran-(butyl acrylate)]
alternating	alt (C)	poly[styrene-alt-(maleic anhydride)]
periodic	per (C)	poly[styrene-per-isoprene-per-(4-vinylpyridine)]
block	block (C)	poly(buta-1,3-diene)-block-poly(ethene-co-propene)
graft^{a}	graft (C)	polystyrene-graft-poly(ethylene oxide)

^{a} The first name is that of the main chain.

=== Non-linear polymers ===
Non-linear polymers and copolymers, and polymer assemblies are named using the italicized qualifiers in Table 2. The qualifier, such as branch, is used as a prefix (P) when naming a (co)polymer, or as a connective (C), e.g., comb, between two polymer names.

Qualifiers for non-linear (co)polymers and polymer assemblies
(Co)polymer	Qualifier	Example
blend	blend (C)	poly(3-hexylthiophene)-blend-polystyrene
comb	comb (C)	polystyrene-comb-polyisoprene
complex	compl (C)	poly(2,3-dihydrothieno[3,4-b][1,4]dioxine)-compl- poly(vinylbenzenesulfonic acid)^{a}
cyclic	cyclo (P)	cyclo-polystyrene-graft-polyethylene
branch	branch (P)	branch-poly[(1,4-divinylbenzene)-stat-styrene]
network	net (C or P)	(net-polystyrene)-ipn-[net-poly(methyl acrylate)]
interpenetrating network	ipn (C)	(net-polystyrene)-ipn-[net-poly(methyl acrylate)]
semi-interpenetrating polymer network	sipn (C)	(net-polystyrene)-sipn-polyisoprene
star	star (P)	star-polyisoprene

^{a} In accordance with IUPAC organic nomenclature, square brackets indicate the nature of the locant sites in fused ring systems.

== Structure-Based Nomenclature ==
=== Regular single-strand organic polymers ===
In place of the monomer name used in source-based nomenclature, structure-based nomenclature uses that of the "preferred constitutional repeating unit" (CRU). It can be determined as follows:

1. A large enough part of the polymer chain is drawn to show the structural repetition.
  Consider as an example:
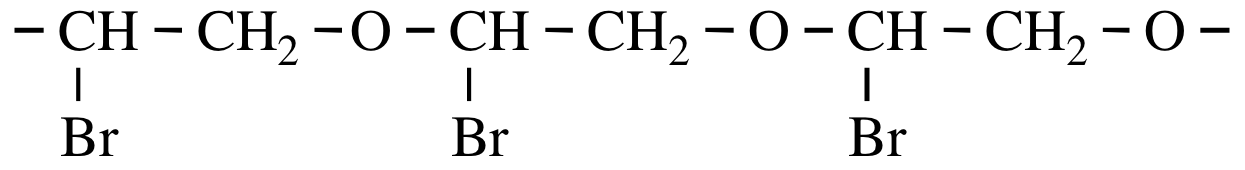
2. The smallest repeating portion is a CRU, so all such possibilities are identified (including multiple directional possibilities for the chain).
  For the preceding polymer, they are:
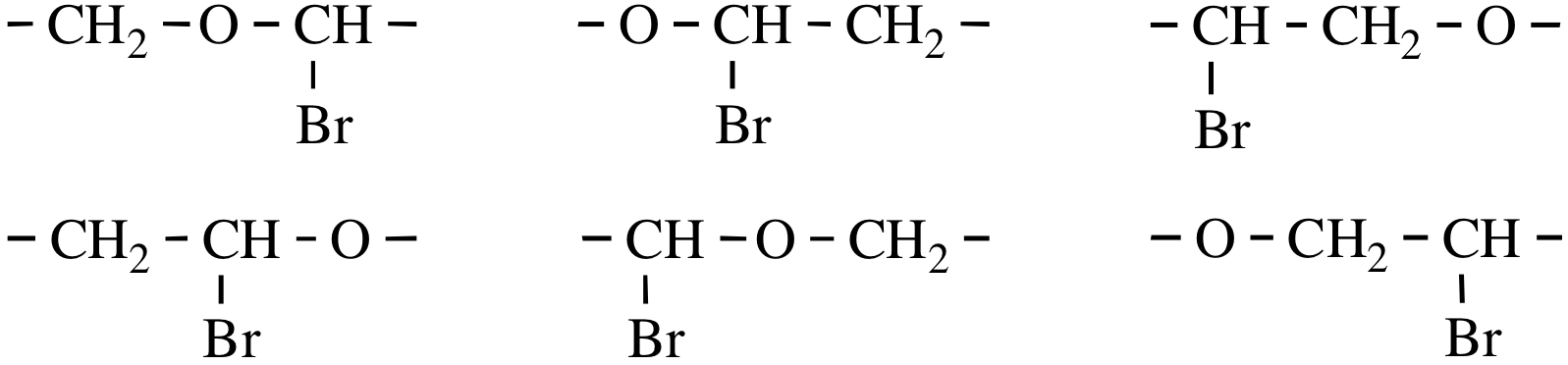
3. The subunits that make up each of these structures are identified, i.e., the largest divalent groups that can be named using IUPAC nomenclature of organic chemistry.
  In the example, the two-carbon ethylidene unit is longer than two separate one-carbon methanediyl units.
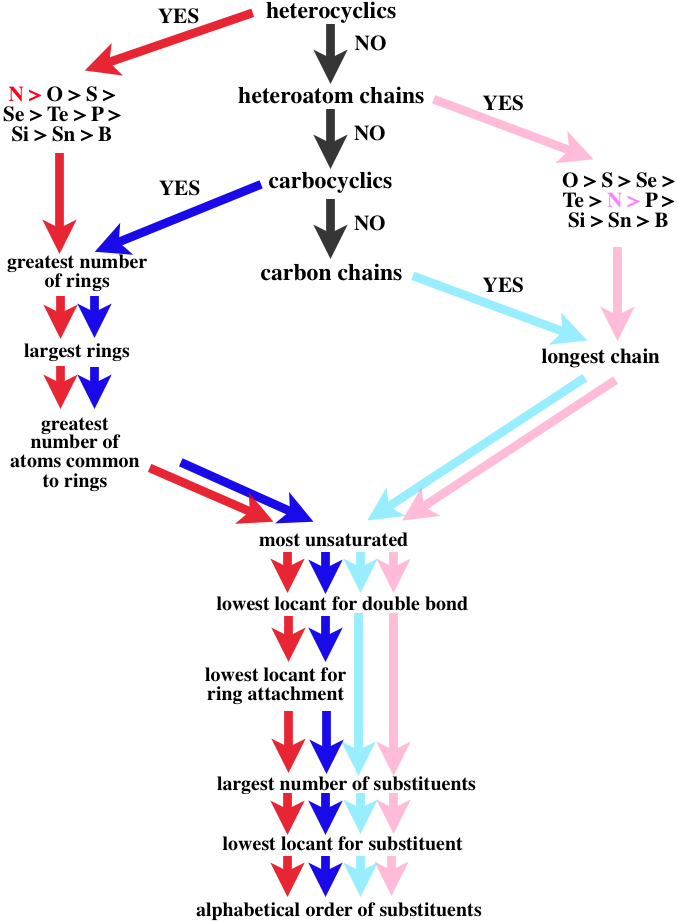
  Figure 1. The order of subunit precedence. The subunit with the highest precedence is at the top centre. Subunits of lower precedence are found by following the arrows. The type of subunit, be it a heterocycle, a heteroatom chain, a carbocycle, or a carbon chain, determines the colour arrow to follow.
4. Using the shortest path in order of decreasing precedence of subunits, the correct order of the subunits is determined using Figure 1.
  In the example, the oxy subunits in the CRUs are heteroatom chains. From Figure 1, oxy subunits take precedence over acyclic carbon chain subunits.
5. The preferred CRU is chosen as that with the lowest possible locant(s) for substituents.
  In the example, there is a bromo-substituted -CH_{2}-CH_{2}- subunit. 1-Bromoethane-1,2-diyl is chosen in preference to 2- bromoethane-1,2-diyl as the former has a lower locant for the bromo-substituent. The preferred CRU is therefore oxy(1-bromoethane-1,2-diyl) and the polymer is thus named poly[oxy(1-bromoethane-1,2-diyl)].

Polymers that are not made up of regular repetitions of a single CRU are called irregular polymers. For these, each constitutional unit (CU) is separated by a slash, e.g., poly(but-1-ene-1,4-diyl/1-vinylethane-1,2-diyl).

Representations of divalent groups in polymers
Name	Group^{a}	Name	Group^{a}
oxy	$\ce{-O{-}}$	propylimino	IUPAC propylimino divalent group
sulfanediyl	$\ce{-S{-}}$	hydrazine-1,2-diyl	$\ce{-\overset{1}{N}H2-\overset{2}{N}H2{-}}$
sulfonyl	$\ce{-SO2{-}}$	phthaloyl	IUPAC phthaloyl divalent group
diazenediyl	$\ce{-N=N{-}}$	1,4-phenylene	IUPAC 1,4-phenylene divalent group
imino	$\ce{-NH{-}}$	cyclohexane-1,2-diyl	IUPAC cyclohexane-1,2-diyl divalent group
carbonyl	$\ce{-\overset{\displaystyle O \atop \|}{C}-}$	butane-1,4-diyl	$\ce{-\overset{1}{C}H2\overset{2}{C}H2\overset{3}{C}H2\overset{4}{C}H2{-}}$
oxalyl	$\ce{-\overset{\displaystyle O \atop \|}{C}-\overset{\displaystyle O \atop \|}{C}-}$	1-bromoethane-1,2-diyl	IUPAC 1-bromoethane-1,2-diyl divalent group
silanediyl	$\ce{-SiH2{-}}$	1-oxopropane-1,3-diyl	$\ce{-\underset{1}{\overset{\displaystyle O \atop \|}{C}}-\overset{2}{C}H2\overset{3}{C}H2{-}}$
ethane-1,2-diyl	$\ce{-\overset{1}{C}H2-\overset{2}{C}H2{-}}$	ethene-1,2-diyl	$\ce{-\overset{1}{C}H2=\overset{2}{C}H2{-}}$
methylene	$\ce{-CH2{-}}$	methylmethylene	IUPAC methylmethylene divalent group

^{a} To avoid ambiguity, wavy lines drawn perpendicular to the free bond,
which are conventionally used to indicate free valences,
are usually omitted from graphical representations in a polymer context.

=== Regular double-strand organic polymers ===
Double-strand polymers consist of uninterrupted chains of rings. In a spiro polymer, each ring has one atom in common with adjacent rings. In a ladder polymer, adjacent rings have two or more atoms in common. To identify the preferred CRU, the chain is broken so that the senior ring is retained with the maximum number of heteroatoms and the minimum number of free valences.

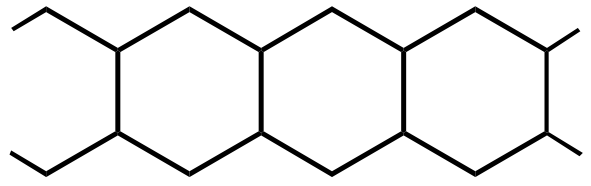
An example is The preferred CRU is an acyclic subunit of 4 carbon atoms with 4 free valences, one at each atom, as shown.

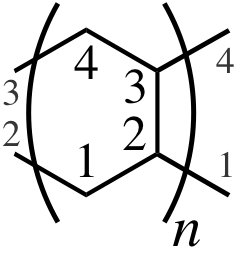

It is oriented so that the lower left atom has the lowest number. The free-valence locants are written before the suffix, and they are cited clockwise from the lower left position as: lower-left, upper-left:upper-right, lower-right. This example is thus named poly(butane-1,4:3,2-tetrayl). For more complex structures, the order of seniority again follows Figure 1.

== Nomenclature of Inorganic and Inorganic-Organic Polymers ==
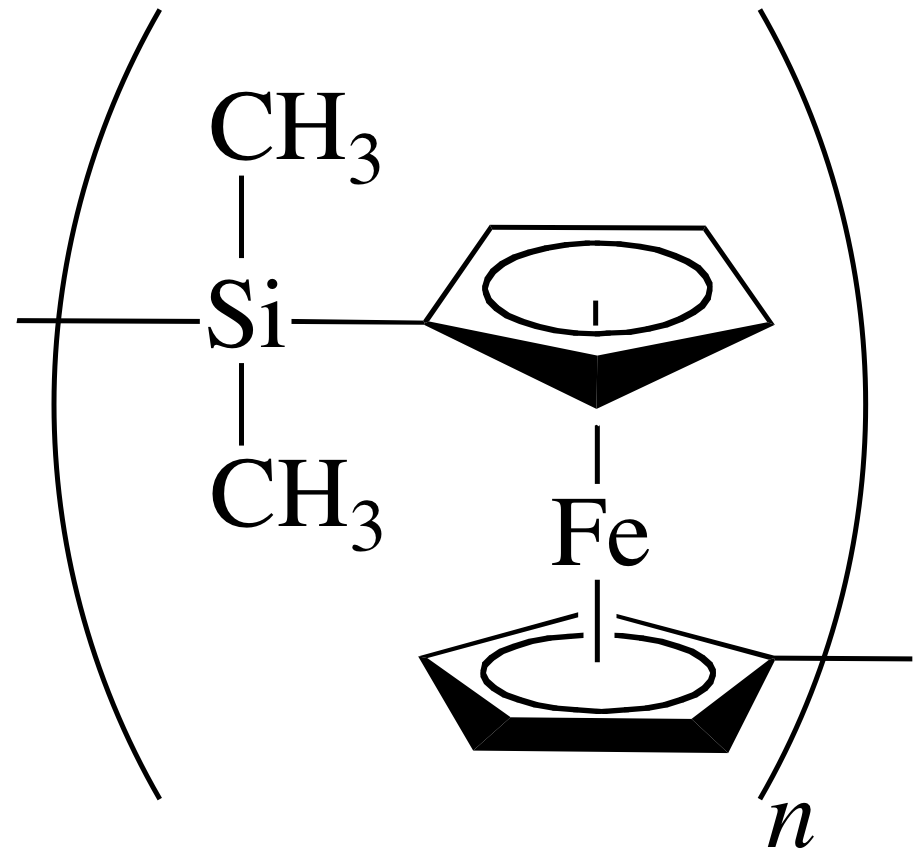
Poly[(dimethylsilanediyl)ferrocene-1,1'-diyl

Some regular single-strand inorganic polymers can be named like organic polymers using the rules given above, e.g., −[O−Si(CH_{3})_{2}]_{n}− and −[Sn(CH_{3})_{2}]_{n}− are named poly[oxy(dimethylsilanediyl)] and poly(dimethylstannanediyl), respectively. Inorganic polymers can also be named in accordance with inorganic nomenclature, but the seniority of the elements is different from that in organic nomenclature. However, certain inorganic and inorganic-organic polymers, for example those containing metallocene derivatives, are at present best named using organic nomenclature, e.g., the polymer shown can be named poly[(dimethylsilanediyl)ferrocene-1,1'-diyl].

== Traditional Names ==
When they fit into the general pattern of systematic nomenclature, some traditional and trivial names for polymers in common usage, such as polyethylene, polypropylene, and polystyrene, are retained.

== Graphical Representations ==
The bonds between atoms can be omitted, but dashes should be drawn for chain-ends. The seniority of the subunits does not need to be followed. For single-strand (co)polymers, a dash is drawn through the enclosing marks, e.g., poly[oxy(ethane-1,2-diyl)] shown below left. For irregular polymers, the CUs are separated by slashes, and the dashes are drawn inside the enclosing marks. End-groups are connected using additional dashes outside of the enclosing marks, e.g., α-methyl-ω-hydroxy-poly[oxirane-co-(methyloxirane)], shown below right.

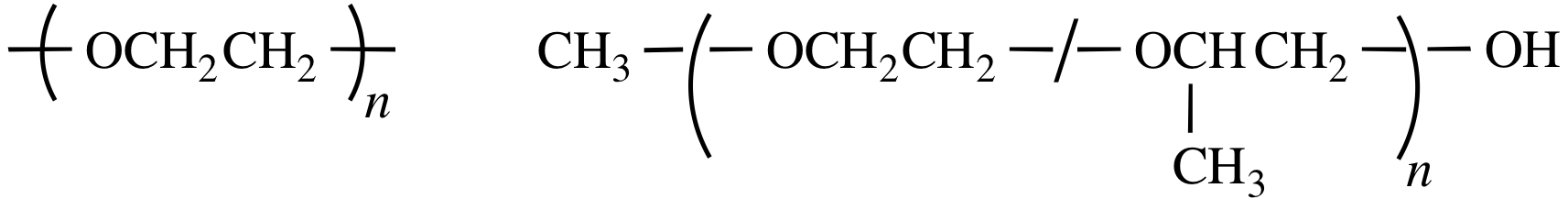

== CA Index Names ==
CAS maintains a registry of substances. In the CAS system, the CRU is called a structural repeating unit (SRU). There are minor differences in the placements of locants, e.g., poly(pyridine-3,5-diylthiophene-2,5-diyl) is poly(3,5-pyridinediyl-2,5-thiophenediyl) in the CAS registry, but otherwise polymers are named using similar methods to those of IUPAC.
