= Steiner tunnel test =

Test for flammability of building materials

The Steiner tunnel test is a widely used method of testing building interior wall and ceiling finishes for their ability to support and propagate fire, and for their tendency to emit smoke. The test was developed in 1944 by Al Steiner of Underwriters Laboratories, and has been incorporated as a reference into North American standards for materials testing as tests ASTM E84, NFPA 255, UL 723 and ULC S102. These standards are in widespread use for the regulation and selection of materials for interior building construction throughout North America.

The test may be carried out inside a dedicated, instrumented test apparatus. The test itself involves an assembly of the tested material, fabricated into an otherwise noncombustible horizontal box or tunnel as the tunnel's roof, in a section 7.3 metres (24 ft) long and 0.56 metres (1.8 ft) wide. The tunnel is as wide and long as the test specimen, and 0.305 metres (1.00 ft) high. The apparatus is equipped with two gas burners providing a flame intensity of 89 kilowatts, and air and combustion products are moved through the tunnel by a ventilation system at a controlled velocity of 73 metres (240 ft) per minute.

The progress of the flame front across the test material is measured by visual observation, while the smoke emitted from the end of the test assembly is measured as a factor of optical density. A flame spread index (FSI) and a smoke-developed index are calculated from these results. Both indices use an arbitrary scale in which asbestos-cement board has a value of 0, and red oak wood has 100.

The tunnel test does not measure the ignitability of materials, nor does it properly assess the behavior of thermoplastic materials which may tend to melt and drip from the assembly, or for materials with slow flame spread properties. It likewise does not give a true assessment of the smoke emanating from very thin materials. Other tests, such as the "critical radiant flux" test (ASTM E648/NFPA 253) are more suitable for establishing ignitability. The "methenamine pill test" (ASTM D 2859) is used to judge the ignitability of flooring carpet.

== See also ==
- Flammability
- Fire test
- Fire-safe polymers
