= Fire test =

Test of fire protection performance

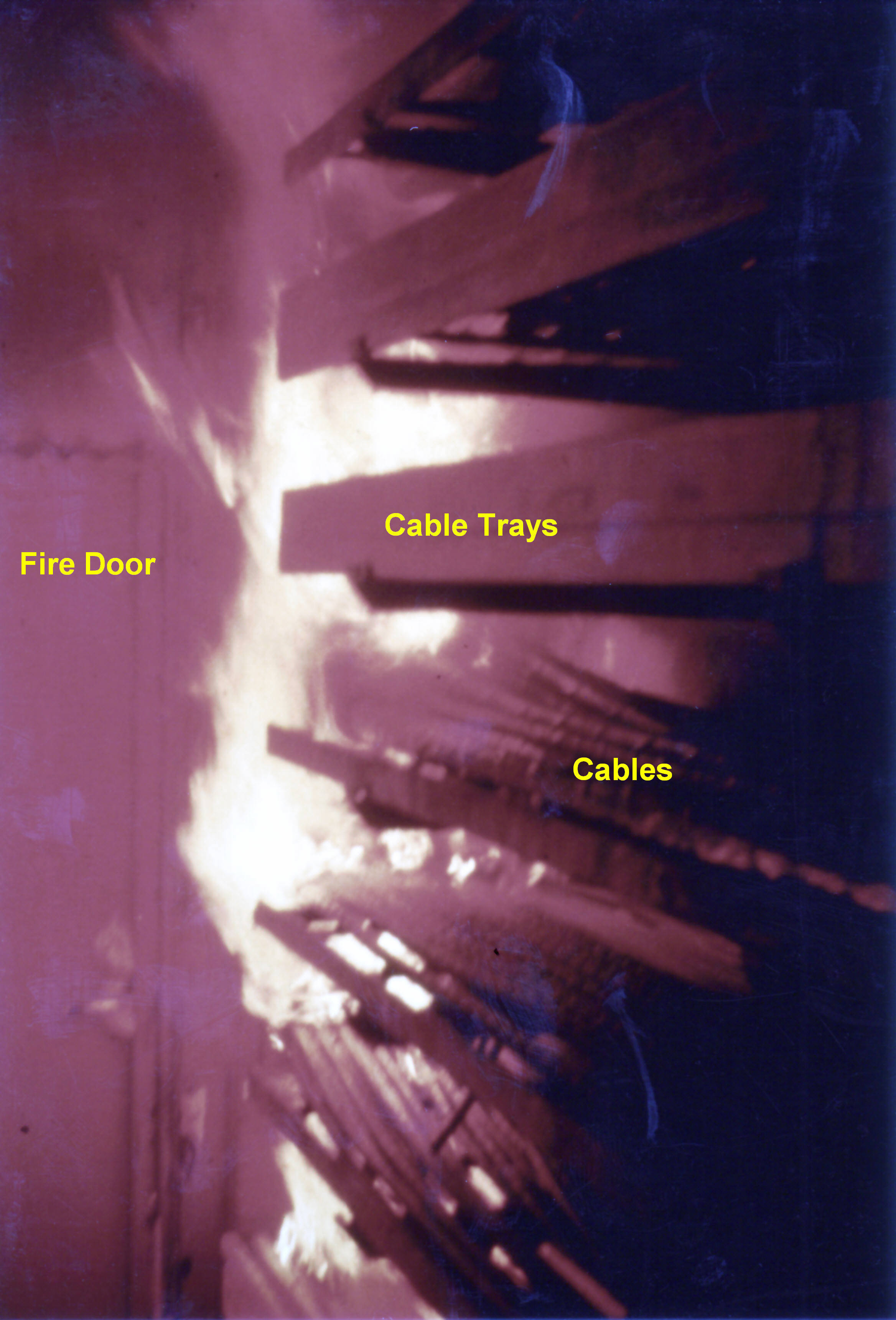
Fire test in Sweden, showing rapid fire spread through burning of cable jackets from one cable tray to another

A fire test is a means of determining whether fire protection products meet minimum performance criteria as set out in a building code or other applicable legislation. Successful tests in laboratories holding national accreditation for testing and certification result in the issuance of a certification listing.

Components and systems subject to certification fire testing include fire rated walls and floors, closures within them such as windows, fire doors, fire dampers, structural steel, and fire stops. Fire tests are conducted both on active fire protection and on passive fire protection items. There are full-scale, small-scale and bench-scale tests.

Fire testing considers all applicable provisions of the product certification.

== Examples of fire testing for products and systems ==
- ASTM E84 Standard Test Method for Surface Burning Characteristics of Building Materials, also known as the Steiner tunnel test
- ASTM E1354 Standard Test Method for Heat and Visible Smoke Release Rates for Materials and Products Using an Oxygen Consumption Calorimeter
- ASTM D7309 Standard Test Method for Determining Flammability Characteristics of Plastics and Other Solid Materials Using Microscale Combustion Calorimetry
- ASTM D2863 Standard Test Method for Measuring the Minimum Oxygen Concentration to Support Candle-Like Combustion of Plastics (Oxygen Index)
- DIN 4102 Part 1 Fire behaviour of building materials and building components – Part 1: Building materials; concepts, requirements and tests
- UL 94 Standard for Tests for Flammability of Plastic Materials for Parts in Devices and Appliances
- UL 2221 Tests of Fire Resistive Grease Duct Enclosure Assemblies
- UL 1479 Fire Tests of Through-Penetration Firestops
- UL 1709 Rapid Rise Fire Tests of Protection Materials for Structural Steel
- UL 2085 Protected Aboveground Tanks for Flammable and Combustible Liquids
- EN 16034 Pedestrian doorsets, industrial, commercial, garage doors and openable windows – Product standard, performance characteristics – Fire resisting and/or smoke control characteristics
- FAR 25.853 [a-1] & ASTM E 906 Standard Test Method for Heat and Visible Smoke Release Rates for Materials and Products, also known as the OSU Test

== Ad hoc fire testing ==
A fire test can also mean an ad hoc test performed to gather information in order to understand a specific hazard, such as a construction or storage configuration. Tests can be bench scale (e.g., flammable liquid flash point), medium scale (e.g., storage commodity classification), or full scale (e.g., replication of an entire rack storage configuration). Typical information gathered from full-scale testing is heat release rate vs. time, smoke production and species composition, radiant heat, and interaction with fire control or suppression systems.

== Fire test examples ==
Many fire tests are run by official laboratories for the purpose of product certification. However, some manufacturers of fire protection products also maintain their own facilities and run tests for R & D purposes before going to the expense and exposure of a test at a third party facility.

Some universities have functioning fire research groups which are equipped to run fire tests on building materials.

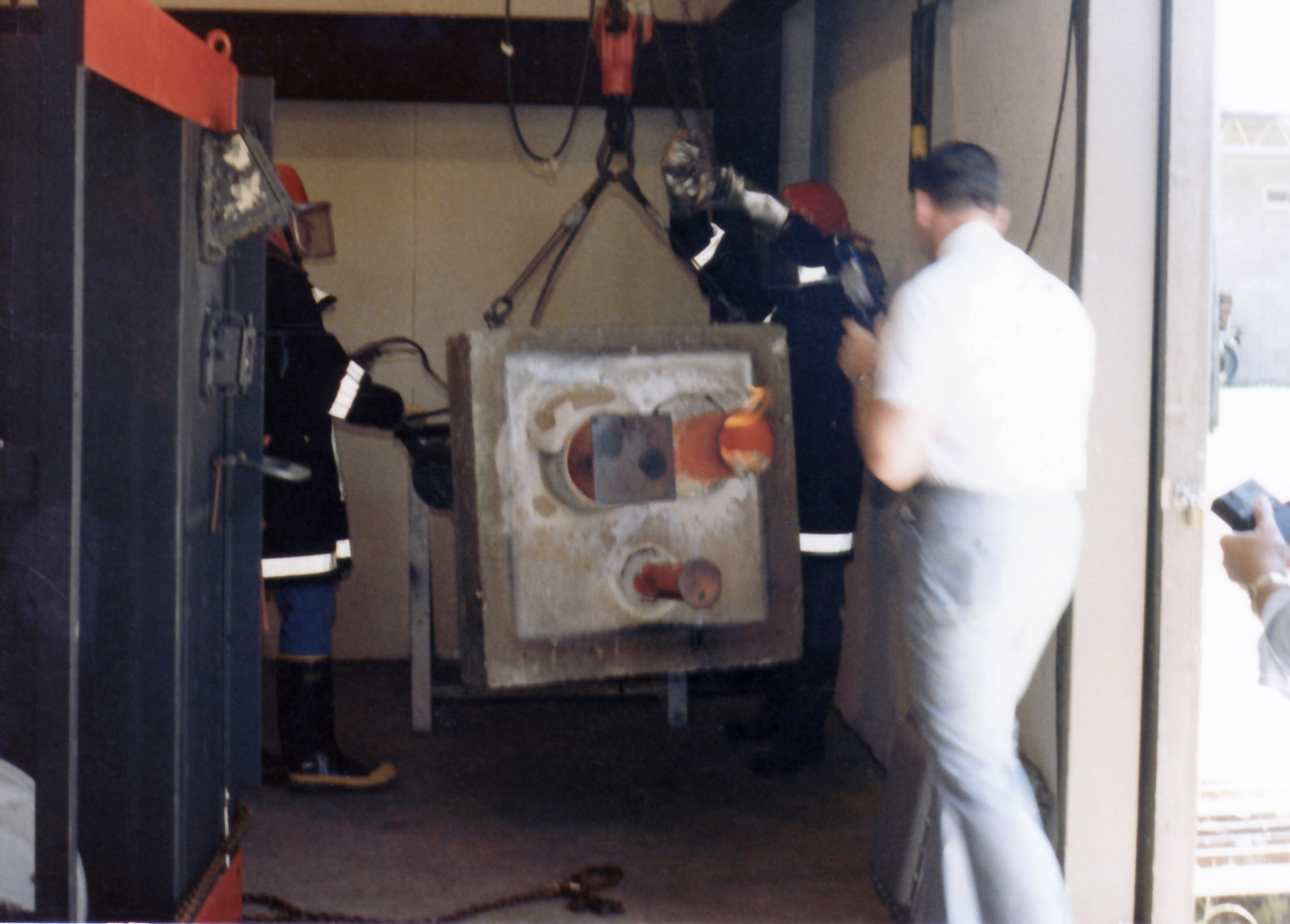
Private fire test furnace used for research and development by a firestop manufacturer

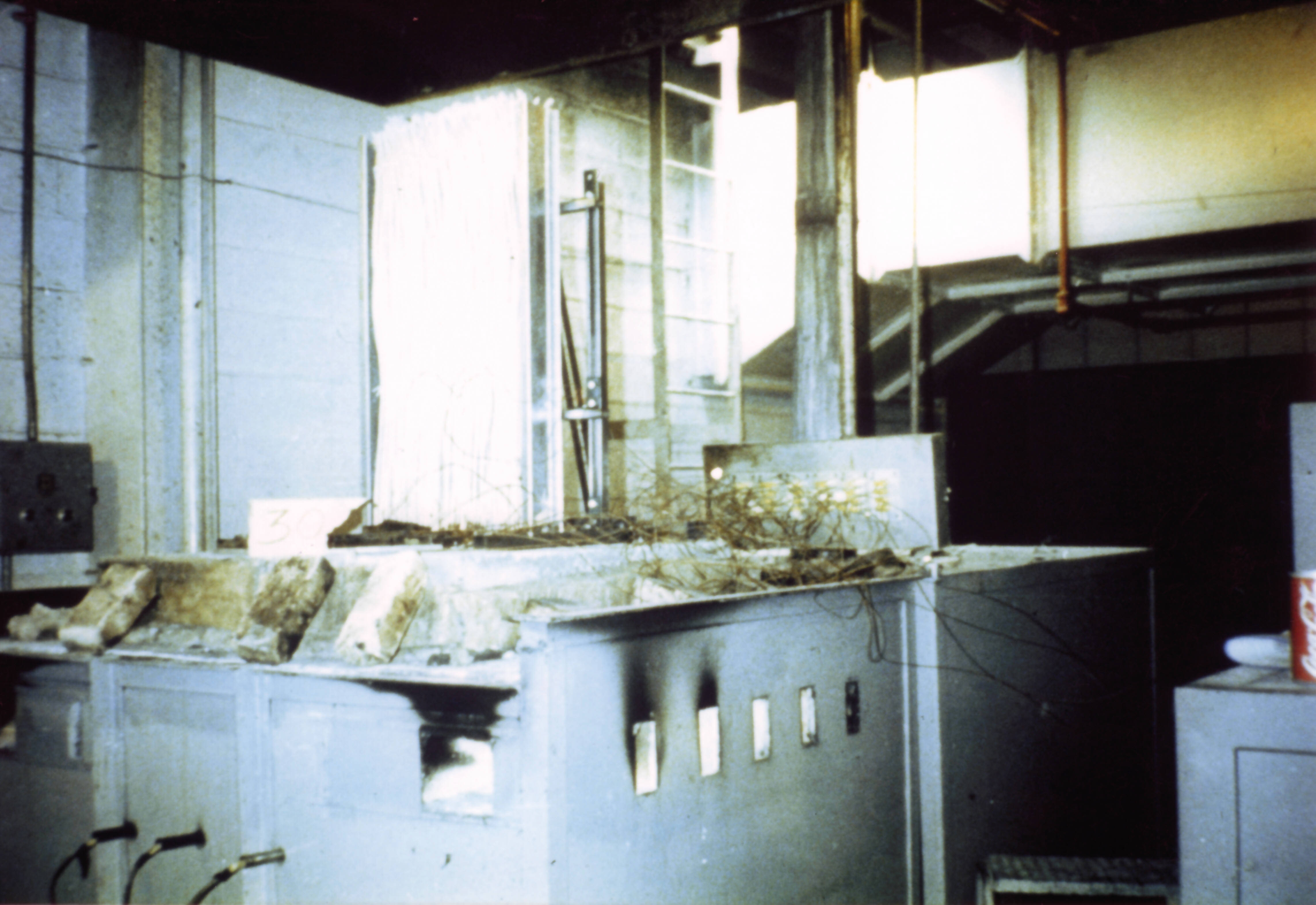
Private test furnace, ready to test a cable tray firestop system

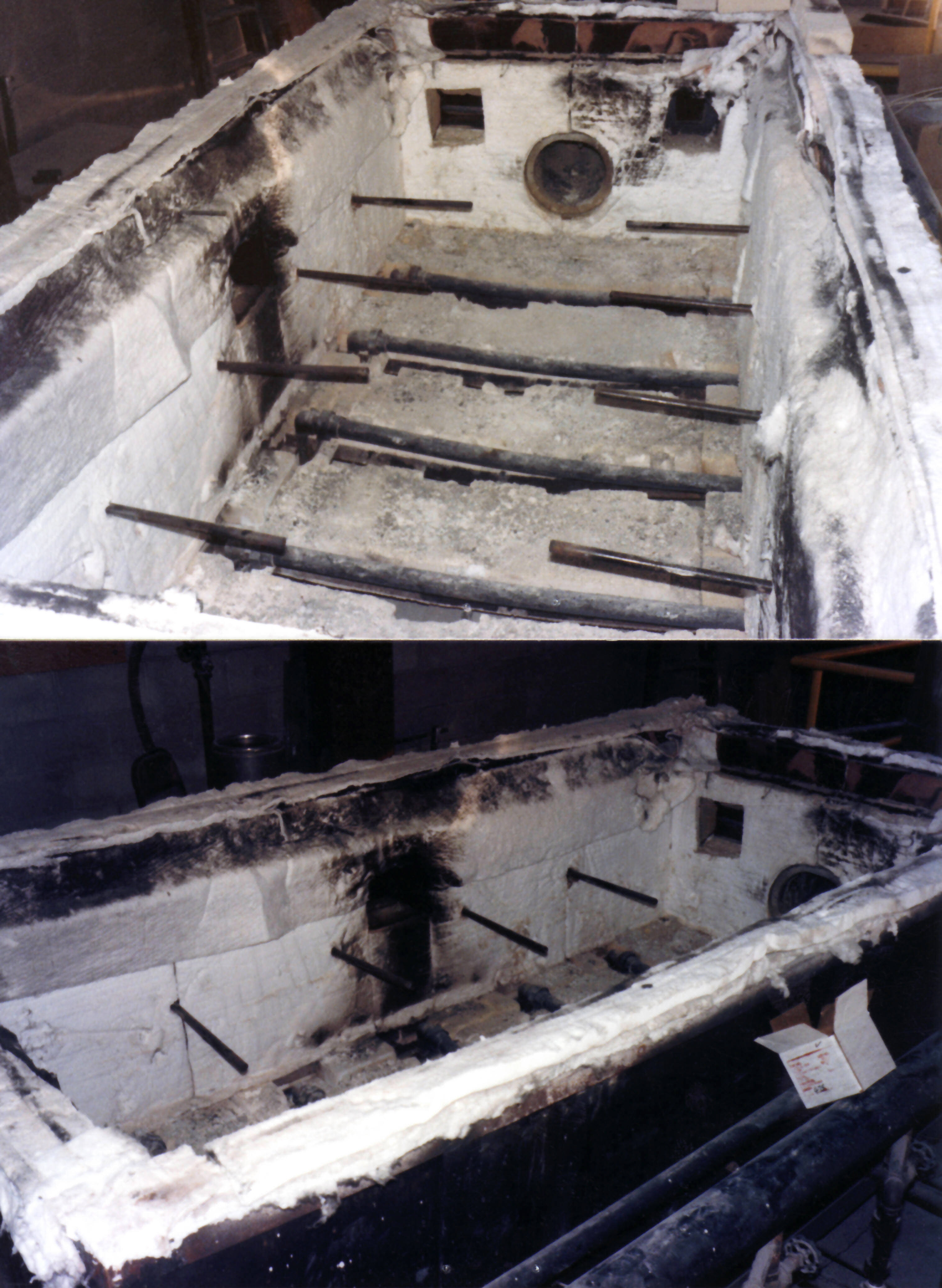
Furnace used in fire testing.

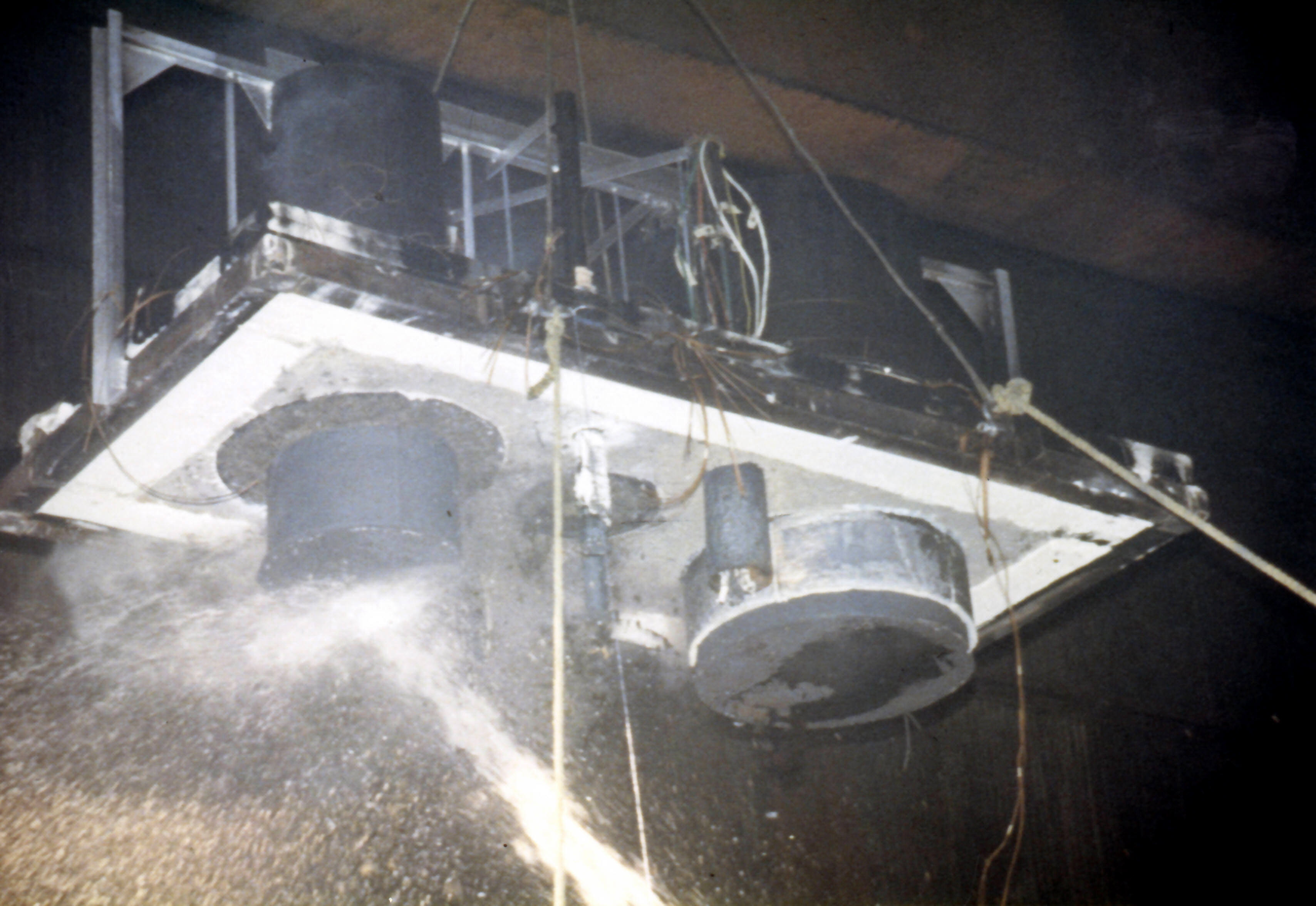
Following successful three hour fire endurance test, application of hose stream

== See also ==
- Firestop
- Listing and approval use and compliance
- Product certification
- Intumescent
- Firestop Mortar
- Silicone
- Fire-resistance rating
- Certification listing
- Dalmarnock tests
