= Migdal HaEmek =

City in northern Israel

Migdal HaEmek: מִגְדַּל הָעֵמֶק; مجدال هعيمق
- City

Hebrew transcription(s)
  - ISO 259: Migdal ha ʕemq
  - Also spelled: Migdal HaEmeq (official)
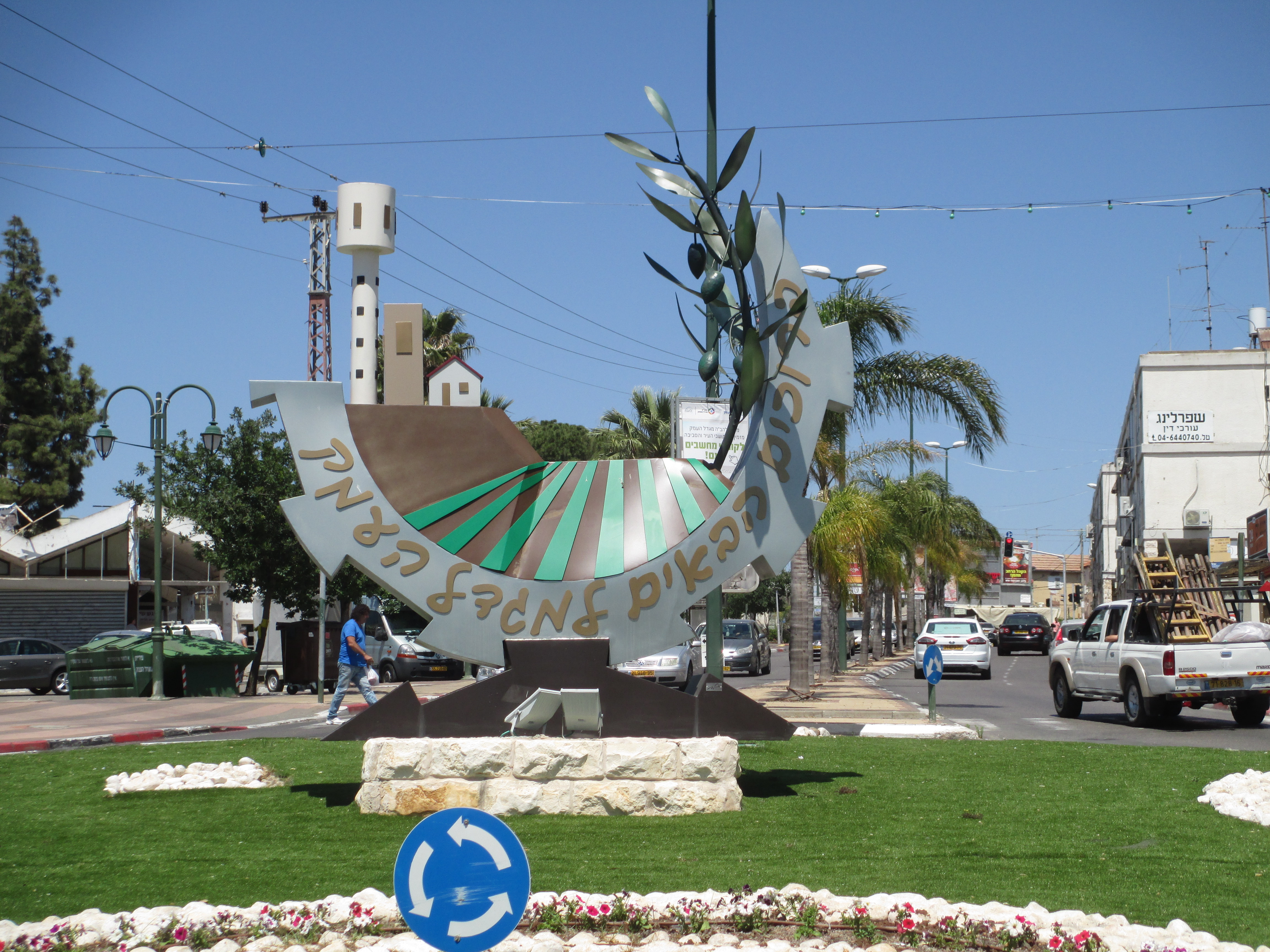
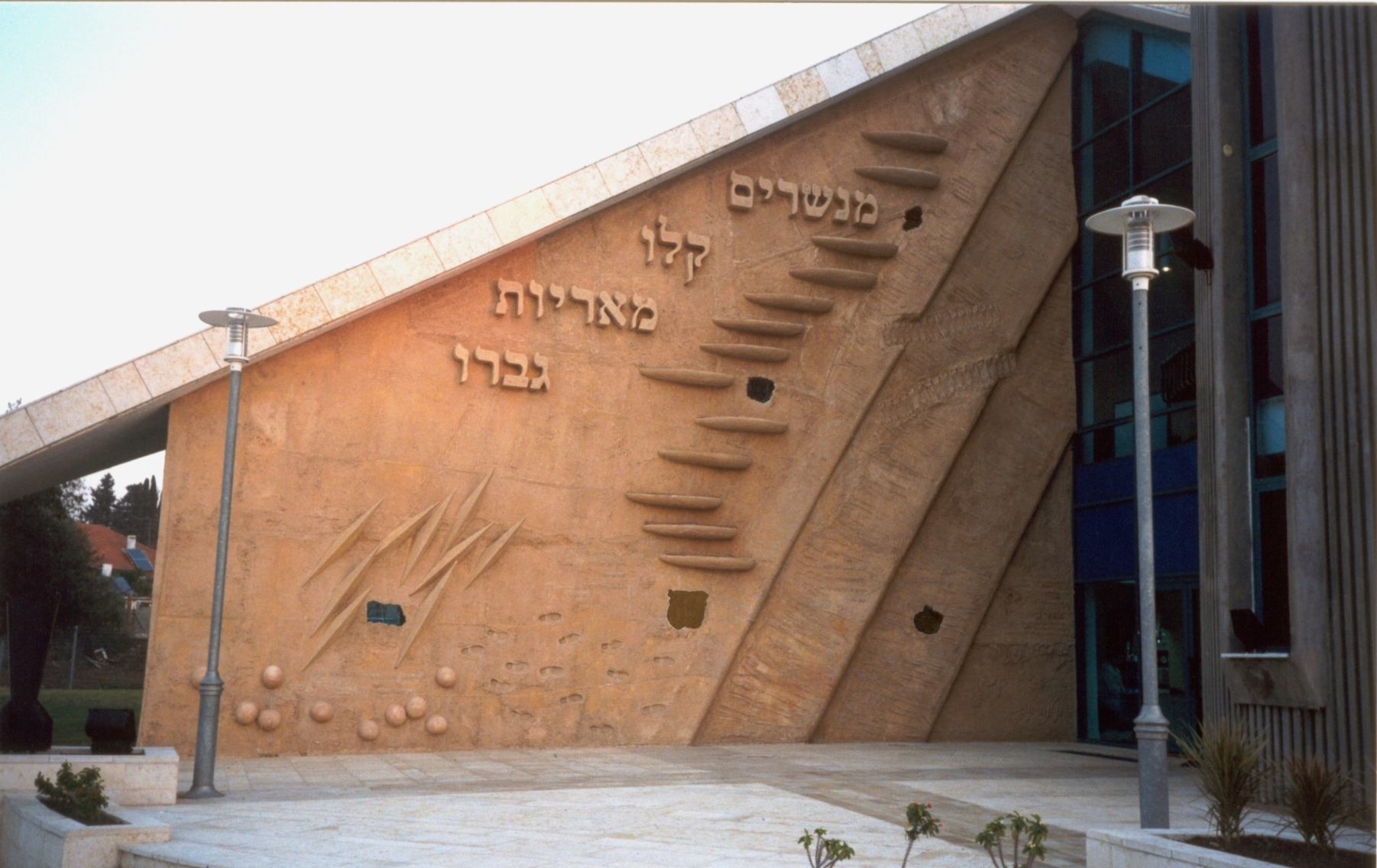
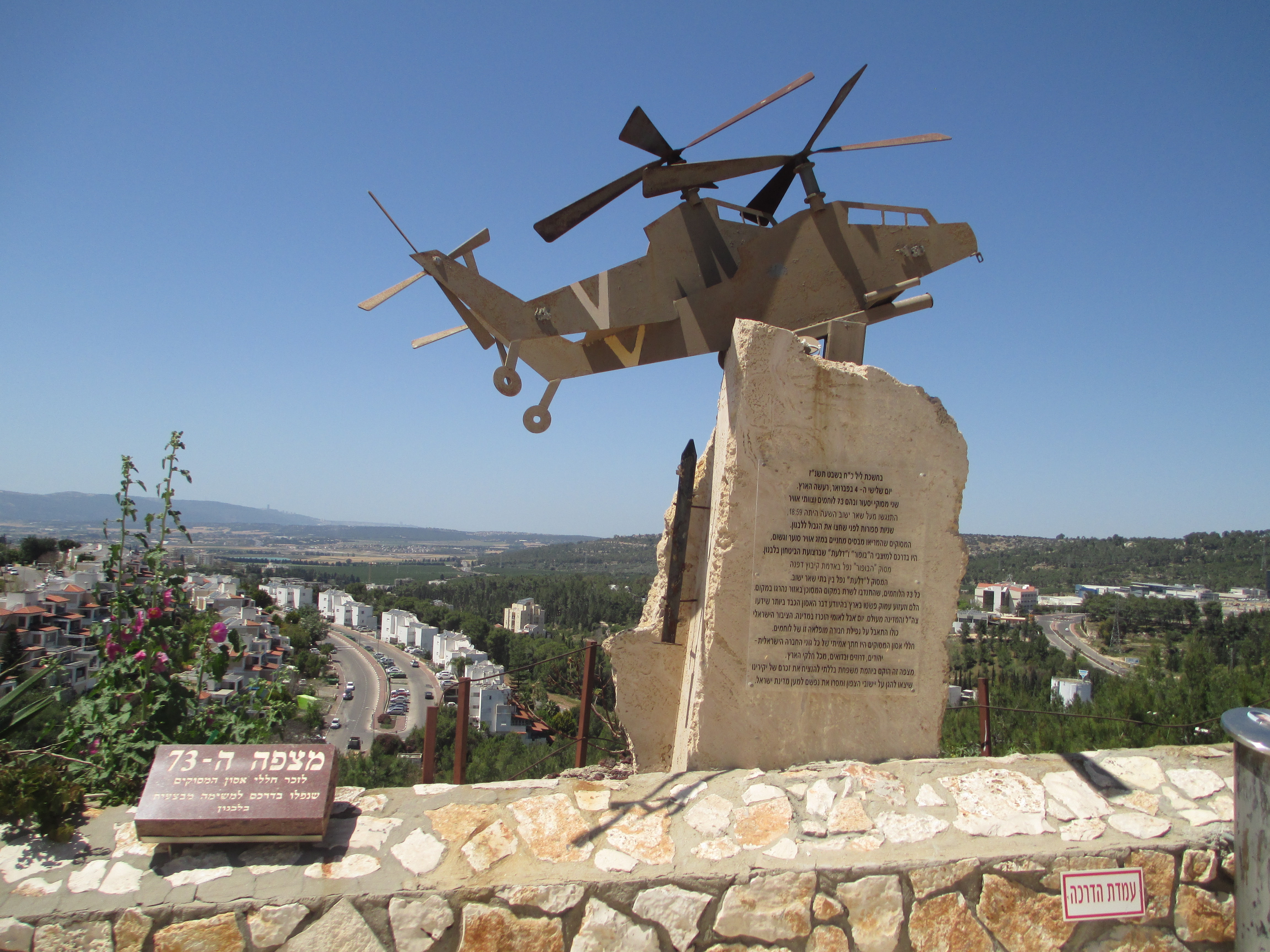
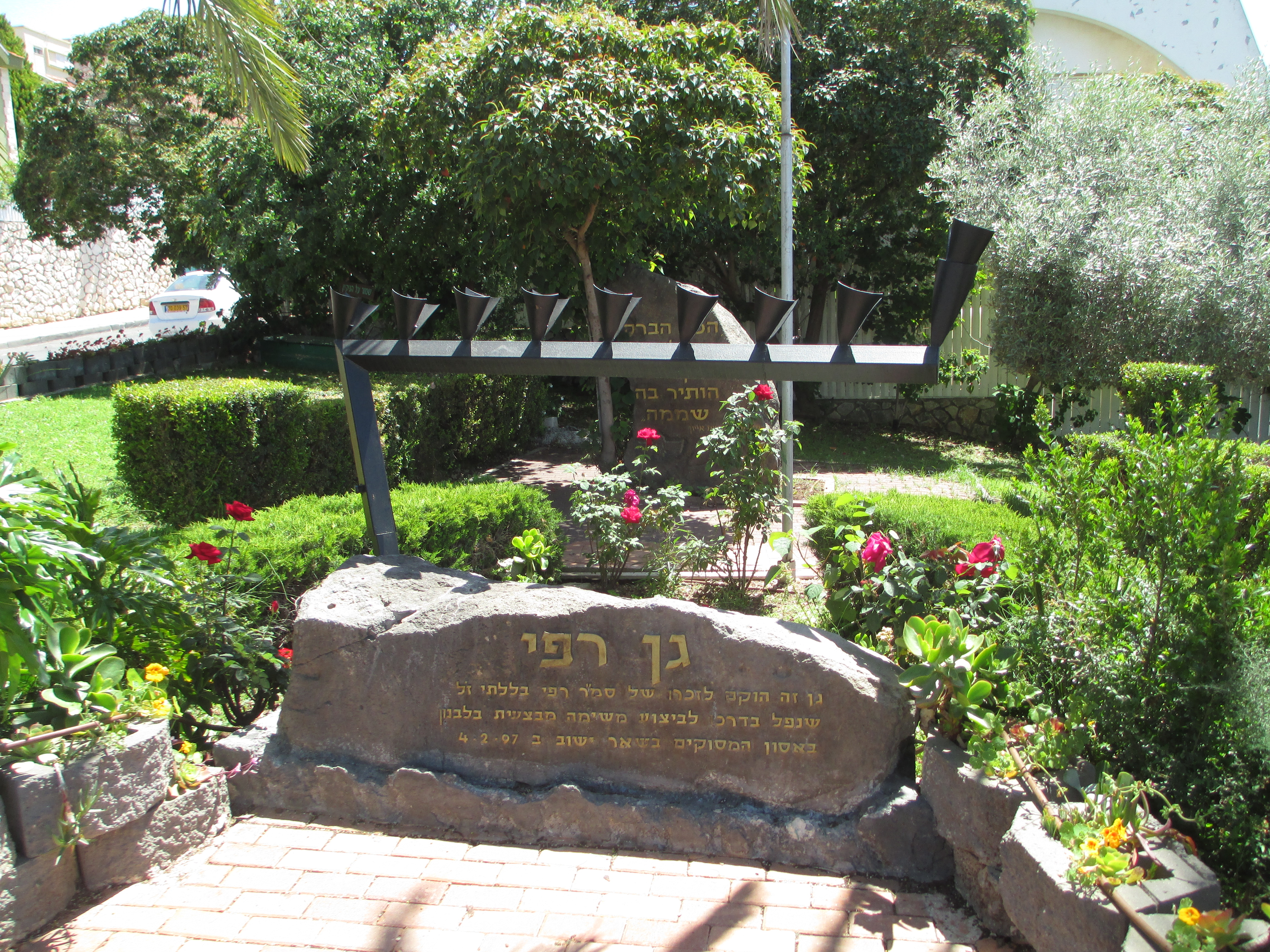
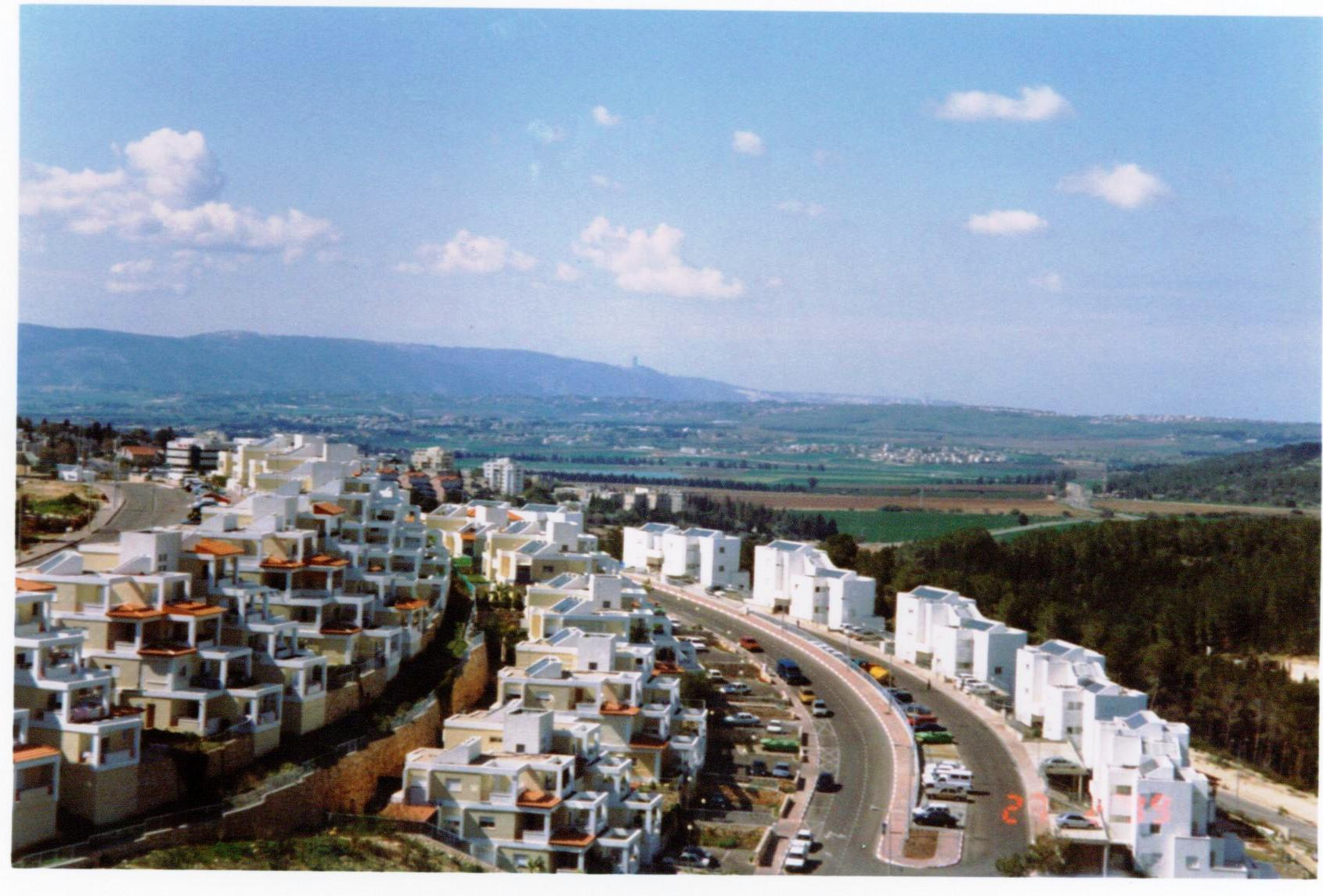

- Location within Jezreel Valley region of Israel Location within Israel
- Coordinates: 32°40′17″N 35°14′26″E
- Country: Israel
- District: Northern
- Subdistrict: Jezreel
- Natural Region: Nazareth-Tir'an Mountains
- Founded: 1953

Government
  - Mayor: Yaki Ben Haim

Area
  - Total: 7,637 dunams (7.637 km^{2}; 2.949 sq mi)

Population (2024)
  - Total: 28,430
  - Density: 3,723/km^{2} (9,642/sq mi)

Ethnicity
  - Jews and others: 99.95%
  - Arabs: 0.05%
- Name meaning: Tower of the Valley

Migdal HaEmek (Hebrew: מִגְדַּל הָעֵמֶק, lit. Tower of the Valley, also officially spelled Migdal HaEmeq, Arabic: مجدال هعيمق) is a city in the Northern District of Israel. In 2024 it had a population of 28,430.

Migdal HaEmek was established in 1953 as a ma'abara for Jews from Arab countries, before becoming a development town. The original site of the ma'abara was west of the current site, at Shimron hill. There is a tower to the north-east, above the town.

Many Israeli and global high tech companies are located in three industrial parks. Among the companies: Tower Semiconductor, RSL Electronics, KLA-Tencor, CI Systems, Nilit, Vishay Intertechnology, Enzymotec and Flex.

== History ==
=== Pre-1948 ===
A Roman road ran nearby, with traces found close to the former village of al-Mujaydil. This may indicate that the region was opened to intensive settlement during the Roman period.

Prior to 1953, in the area where Migdal HaEmek was to be established, stood the former Arab Palestinian village of al-Mujaydil. It had existed there since at least 1596 during the Ottoman period. In July 1948 al-Mujaydil was completely destroyed due to aerial bombing during the operations conducted by the Golani Brigade, when the villagers fled, resulting in its depopulation.

=== Migdal HaEmek (est. 1953) ===
Migdal HaEmek was established in 1953 as a ma'abara for Jews from Arab countries, before becoming a development town. The original site of the ma'abara was west of the current site, at Shimron hill.

In 1959, during the Wadi Salib riots, the "Union des Nords-africains led by David Ben Haroush, organised a large-scale procession walking towards the nice suburbs of Haifa creating little damages but a great fear within the population. This small incident was taken as an occasion to express the social malaise of the different Oriental communities in Israel and riots spread quickly to other parts of the country; mostly in towns with a high percentage of the population having North African extraction like in Tiberias, in Beer-Sheva, in Migdal HaEmek."

The chief rabbi of the city is Rabbi Yitzchak Dovid Grossman, who won the Israel Prize in 2004 for his social service work and outreach youth programs. Every year volunteers from Habonim Dror come to Migdal HaEmek to volunteer in the community.

== Demographics ==
Historical population
Year	Pop.	±%
1972	10,000	—
1983	13,400	+34.0%
1995	21,900	+63.4%
2008	23,900	+9.1%
2022	27,045	+13.2%
2024	28,431	+5.1%

According to CBS, in 2001 the ethnic makeup of the city was all Jewish and "other" non-Arabs. There were 11,900 males and 12,200 females. More recently the Jewish Agency estimated Migdal HaEmek's population at 28,000, almost half foreign-born, from Russia, the Caucasus, Ethiopia, Morocco, Iraq and South America. In 2022, 87.5% of the population was Jewish and 12.5% was counted as other.

== Education ==
According to CBS, there were 22 schools and 5,777 students in the city in 2001: 13 elementary schools (2,995 students), and 2 high schools (2,782 students). 47.8% of 12th grade students qualified for a matriculation certificate in 2001.

== Economy ==
Many Israeli and global high-tech companies are located in three industrial parks. Among the companies: Tower Semiconductor (foundry), RSL Electronics (Control and Diagnostic solutions for defence and commercial applications ), KLA-Tencor (inspection tools), CI Systems (electro-optical test systems, non contact temperature sensors and wet chemistry analyzers), Nilit (Nylon for textile industry and thermoplastics for industrial and commercial applications), Vishay Intertechnology (discrete and passive semiconductors components), Enzymotec (functional lipids) and Flex (Electronics contract manufacturer).

== Voting patterns ==
In the 2022 election, 69 percent of voters in Migdal HaEmek voted for the parties of the right-wing coalition led by Benjamin Netanyahu, while 30 percent voted for the parties of the center-left coalition led by Yair Lapid and 0.1 percent voted for the Arab parties.

In the 2026 election, 65 percent of voters in Migdal HaEmek voted for the parties of the right-wing coalition led by Benjamin Netanyahu, while 30 percent voted for the parties of the center-left coalition led by Gadi Eisenkot and 0.1 percent voted for the Arab parties. An additional 2.6 percent voted for the Reservists, and 1.5 percent voted for Amcha Yisrael. Voter turnout increased 16 percent from the 2022 election.

== Notable people ==
- Haim Dayan (born 1960), former politician
- Naama Lazimi (born 1986), member of the Knesset
- Rabbi Nachman Bulman, who founded an Orthodox community there
