= Plastic compounding =

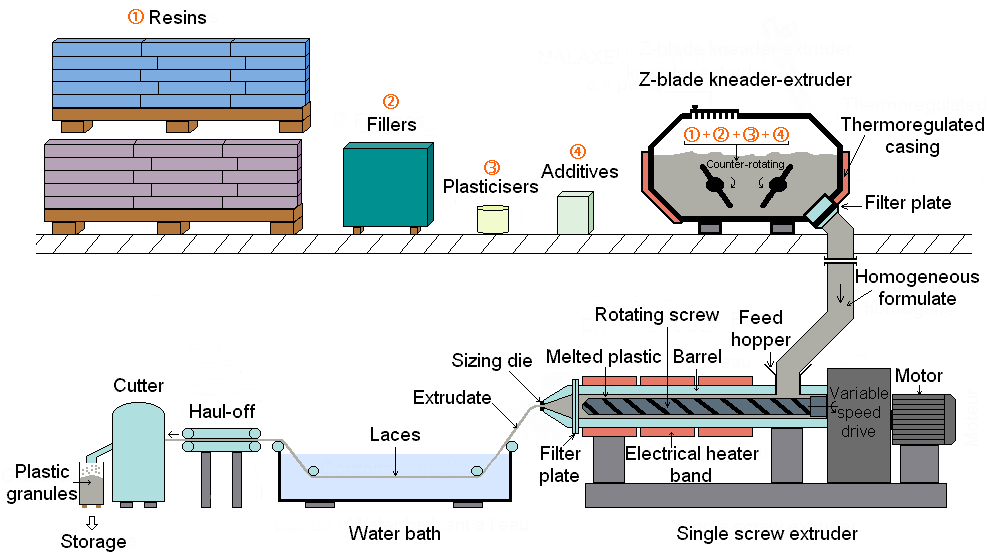
Plastic compounding scheme

Compounding consists of preparing plastic formulations by mixing and/or blending polymers and additives in a molten state to achieve the desired characteristics. These blends are automatically dosed with fixed setpoints usually through feeders/hoppers. It is mostly a blend of copolymers such as ABS, SAN, SMA etc. with additives such as anti-oxidants, UV-stabilizers and other value adding agents and sometimes a strengthening component is added such as glass fibre.

There are different critical criteria to achieve a homogeneous blend of the different raw material. Dispersive and distributive mixing as well as heat are important factors.

Compounding is usually done by extrusion. The hopper feeds the begin of the screw which will gradually transport the resins towards the die. The screw itself is confined in a barrel that has different zones that can be heated according to the resins properties.

Co-kneaders and twin screws (co- and counter rotating) as well internal mixers are the most common used compounders in the plastic industry.

The extrudate, which look like long plastic strands, are then cooled in a water bath, or by spraying as the conveyor belt moves it to the granulator. The granulator breaks the strands into the desired pellet sizes.

== See also ==
- Copolymer
- Composite material
- Masterbatch
