= Sharon Center, Ohio =

Unincorporated community in Ohio, U.S.

- Census-designated place
- Location within Ohio Location within the United States
- Coordinates: 41°5′59″N 81°44′8″W
- Country: United States
- State: Ohio
- County: Medina
- Township: Sharon

Area
  - Total: 4.73 sq mi (12.3 km^{2})
  - Land: 4.73 sq mi (12.3 km^{2})
  - Water: 0.0 sq mi (0 km^{2})
- Elevation: 1,129 ft (344 m)

Population (2020)
  - Total: 918
  - Density: 194.2/sq mi (75.0/km^{2})
- Time zone: UTC-5 (Eastern (EST))
  - Summer (DST): UTC-4 (EDT)
- ZIP Codes: 44274 (Sharon Center); 44281 (Wadsworth); 44256 (Medina)
- FIPS code: 39-71836
- GNIS feature ID: 2812829

Sharon Center is an unincorporated community and census-designated place (CDP) at the geographic center of Sharon Township, Medina County, Ohio, United States. As of the 2020 census it had a population of 918.

== History ==
The first settlement at Sharon Center was made in 1816. A post office called "Sharon Centre" was established in 1833, and the name was changed to Sharon Center in 1893.

Sharon Center was first listed as a census-designated place prior to the 2020 census.

== Geography ==
The community is in northeastern Ohio, in the eastern part of Medina County. The center of the community is at the center of Sharon Township, at the intersection of Ohio state routes 94 and 162. The intersection is a large traffic circle with a park in the center containing a gazebo and several memorials to veterans of various wars. Route 94 leads north 10 miles (16 km) to Hinckley and south 5 miles (8 km) to Wadsworth, while Route 162 leads east 12 miles (19 km) to Akron and west 7 miles (11 km) to the southern outskirts of Medina.

According to the U.S. Census Bureau, the Sharon Center CDP has an area of 4.7 square miles (12.2 km^{2}), all land. The community is drained by Wolf Creek, an east-flowing tributary of the Tuscarawas River, part of the Muskingum River watershed.

== Economy ==
In 2010, A. Schulman closed its manufacturing facility as a consequence of their acquisition of McCann Color.

== Notable people ==
- Karen Archey, art critic and curator
- Daryl Morey, general manager of the Houston Rockets

== See also ==
- Highland Local School District
