= Ladder polymer =

Type of double stranded polymer which resembles a ladder in structure

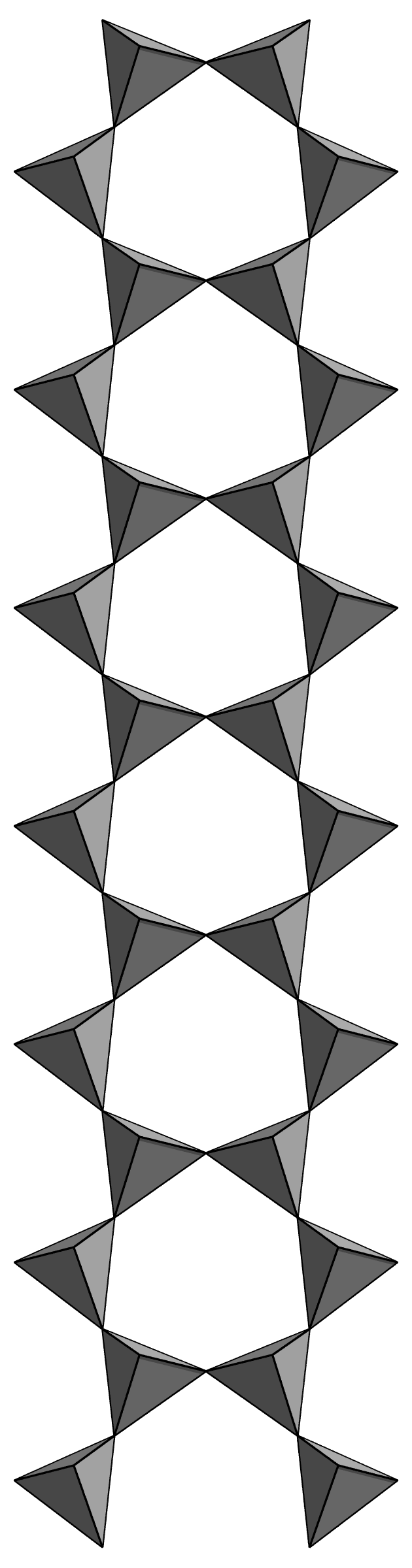
(Si_{4}O_{11}^{6−})_{n} chain in the mineral tremolite, which is an inorganic ladder polymer.

In chemistry, a ladder polymer is a type of double stranded polymer with the connectivity of a ladder. In a typical one-dimensional polymer, e.g. polyethylene and polysiloxanes, the monomers form two bonds, giving a chain. In a ladder polymer the monomers are interconnected by four bonds. Inorganic ladder polymers are found in synthetic and natural settings. Ladder polymers are a special case of cross-linked polymers because the crosslinks exist only with pairs of chains.

According to one definition, a ladder polymer, adjacent rings have two or more atoms in common.

== Organic ladder polymers ==
Organic ladder polymers are of interest because they can exhibit exceptional thermal stabilities and the conformation of the subunits is constrained. Because they are less flexible, their processing can be challenging. An early example was derived from condensation of the 1,2,4,5-tetraaminobenzene with naphthalenetetracarboxylic dianhydride.

Poly(benzimidazobenzophenanthroline) (BBL) is a conjugated ladder polymer. Its backbone is composed of aromatic rings and the ladder structures enable the uninterrupted polymer chains with periodic linkages. However, conjugated ladder polymers additionally contain pi conjugation via strong pi-pi stacking interactions and charge transport. Traditionally, p-typed doped poly(3,4-ethylenedioxythiophene):poly(styrene sulfonate) (PEDOT:PSS) is used as conductive polymers, but BBL doped with poly(ethyleneimine) (PEI) can provide a n-type doped conductive properties for fabricating high-performance organic electronic devices. BBL's glass transition temperature (Tg) is estimated to be around 500 C based on differential scanning calorimetry (DSC) measurements. BBL is stable at higher temperatures. In addition to this, the stress-strain curves of BBL fibers were observed to be very high compared to other semiconductor fibers with a value around 105.8 MPa with the highest BBL polymer concentration.

== Inorganic and organometallic ladder polymers ==
Some polysilicates are ladder polymers. One example is provided by the mineral tremolite.

In the area of coordination chemistry, the ladder structure is seen in some coordination polymers. Illustrative is the polymer [CuI(2-picoline]_{n}. When the 2-picoline is replaced by a tertiary phosphine, it forms a tetrameric cubane-type cluster, [CuI([[PR_{3}]]_{4} (R = organic group_. In both cases, the Cu(I) centers adopt tetrahedral molecular geometry.

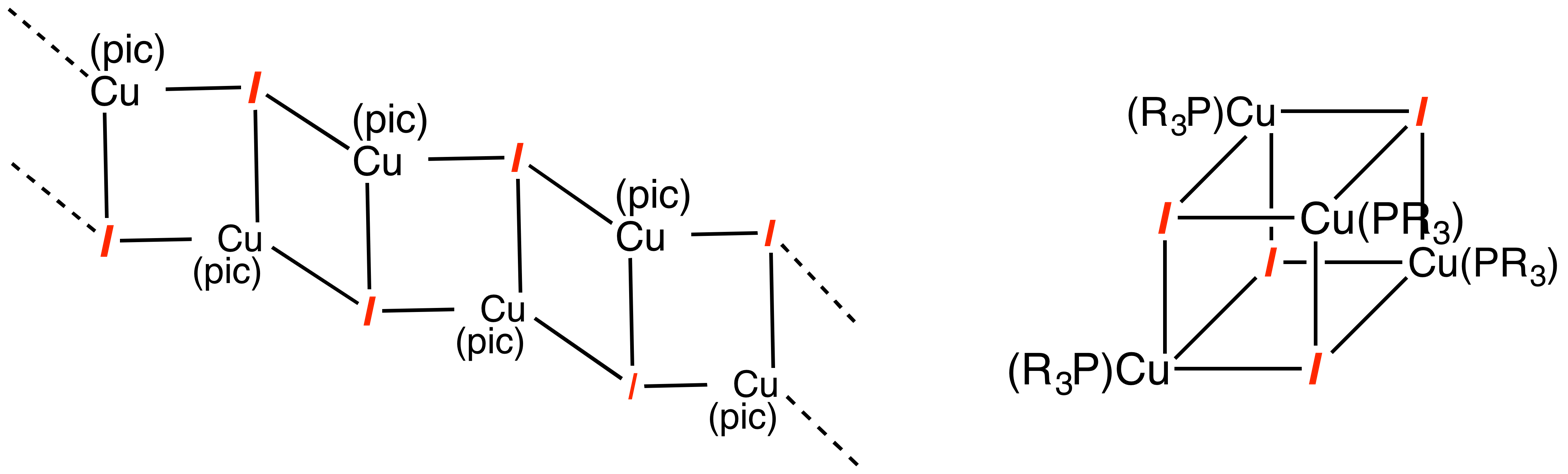
Ladder vs cubane motifs for compounds of the formula [CuL(I)]_{n}.
