= Limiting oxygen index =

Minimum concentration of oxygen supporting combustion

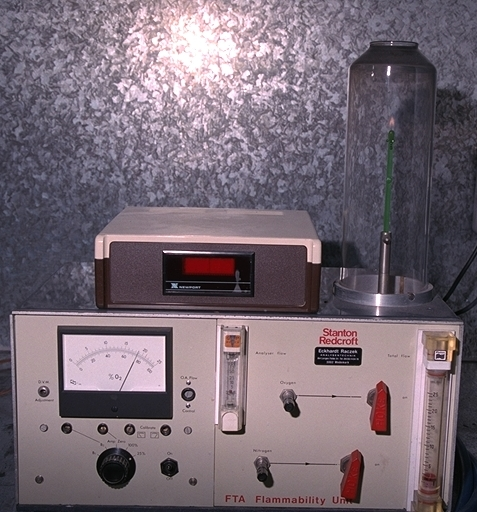
Measuring instrument for determining the oxygen index

The limiting oxygen index (LOI) is the minimum concentration of oxygen, expressed as a percentage, that will support combustion of a polymer. It is measured by passing a mixture of oxygen and nitrogen over a burning specimen, and reducing the oxygen level until a critical level is reached.

LOI values for different plastics are determined by standardized tests, such as the ISO 4589 and ASTM D2863.

The LOI value is also dependent on the surrounding temperature of the sample. The percent of oxygen required for combustion reduces as the surrounding temperature is increased.

Plastics and cable material is tested for its LOI value at both ambient temperature and elevated temperature to understand its oxygen requirement under actual fire conditions.

Materials with an LOI greater than the atmospheric oxygen concentration are called fire retardant materials.

== See also ==
- Fire-resistance rating
