= Comparative Tracking Index =

Measures electrical breakdown of insulating materials

The Comparative Tracking Index (CTI) is used to measure the electrical breakdown (tracking) properties of an insulating material. Tracking is an electrical breakdown on the surface of an insulating material wherein an initial exposure to electrical arcing heat carbonizes the material. The carbonized areas are more conductive than the pristine insulator, increasing current flow, resulting in increased heat generation, and eventually the insulation becomes completely conductive.

== Details ==
A large voltage difference gradually creates a conductive leakage path across the surface of the material by forming a carbonized track. Testing method is specified in IEC standard 60112 and ASTM D3638.

To measure the tracking, 50 drops of 0.1% ammonium chloride solution are dropped on the material, and the voltage measured for a 3 mm thickness is considered representative of the material performance. Also term PTI (Proof Tracking Index) is used: it means voltage at which during testing on five samples the samples pass the test with no failures.

Performance Level Categories (PLC) were introduced to avoid excessive implied precision and bias.

The CTI value is used for electrical safety assessment of electrical apparatus, as for instance carried out by testing and certification laboratories. The minimum required creepage distances over an insulating material between electrically conducting parts in apparatus, especially between parts with a high voltage and parts that can be touched by human users, is dependent on the insulator's CTI value. Also for internal distances in an apparatus by maintaining CTI based distances, the risk of fire is reduced.

Creepage distance requirement depends on the CTI. Material which CTI is unknown are classified in IIIb group. In the case for glass, ceramic, mica and other inorganic insulating materials which do not breakdown on the surface a specified minimum air clearence shall be applied instead.

The better the insulation, the higher the CTI (positive relationship). In terms of clearance, a higher CTI value means a lower minimum creepage distance required, and the closer two conductive parts can be. In printed circuit boards, the CTI of the base laminate sets how closely conductors can be spaced on the board surface. Standard FR-4 glass-epoxy laminate generally falls in material group IIIa (CTI 175 to 399 V), while grades formulated for higher tracking resistance reach 600 V or more (group I) and need roughly half the creepage distance at the same working voltage.

Tracking Index (V)	PLC
600 and Greater	0
400 through 599	1
250 through 399	2
175 through 249	3
100 through 174	4
< 100	5

In design of medical products, the CTI is treated differently. Material groups are classified as shown below, per IEC 60601-1:2005, International Standard published by the International Electrotechnical Commission (IEC):

Comparative Tracking Index (CTI)	Material Group
600 ≤ CTI	I
400 ≤ CTI < 600	II
175 ≤ CTI < 400	IIIa
100 ≤ CTI < 175	IIIb

The test method does not work well for voltages below 125VAC as the solution does not evaporate between successive drops. The test method has an upper limit of 600VAC; higher voltages are currently not covered by the standard. In the recent version of the standard the evaluation of the test method at higher voltages (above 600 V) is stated as a target for the future. In principle, tests at higher voltages should be possible as the breakdown voltage of air at 50 Hz is larger than 40 kV at 4 mm. However, arching between the electrodes might increase at higher voltages and might have an impact on the test result. Therefore, this needs to be further evaluated before the maximum voltage in the standard can be increased. In addition, dependent standards such as IEC 60664 would need to be changed as well in case a new material class for higher voltages is introduced in IEC 60112.
