= Mineral-insulated copper-clad cable =

Type of fire-resistant electrical cable

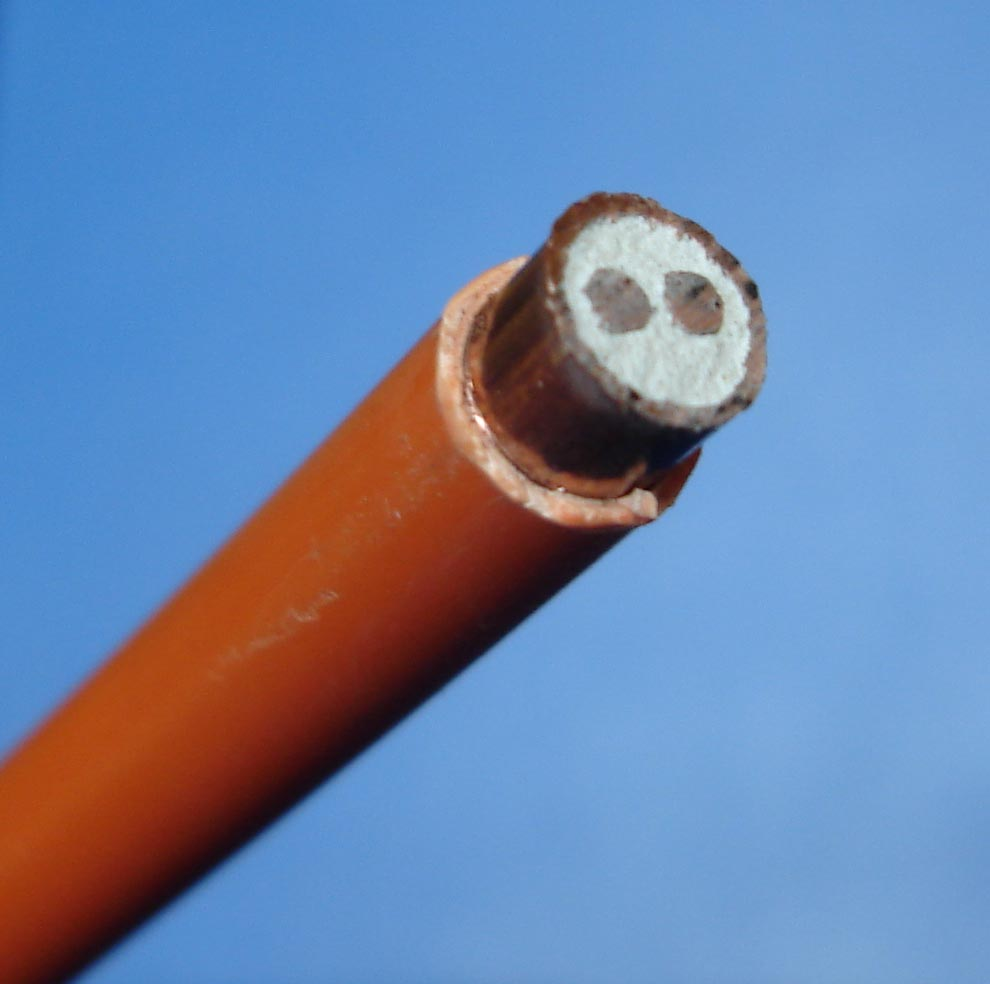
PVC-sheathed MICC cable. Conductor cross section area is 1.5 mm^{2}; overall diameter is 7.2 mm.

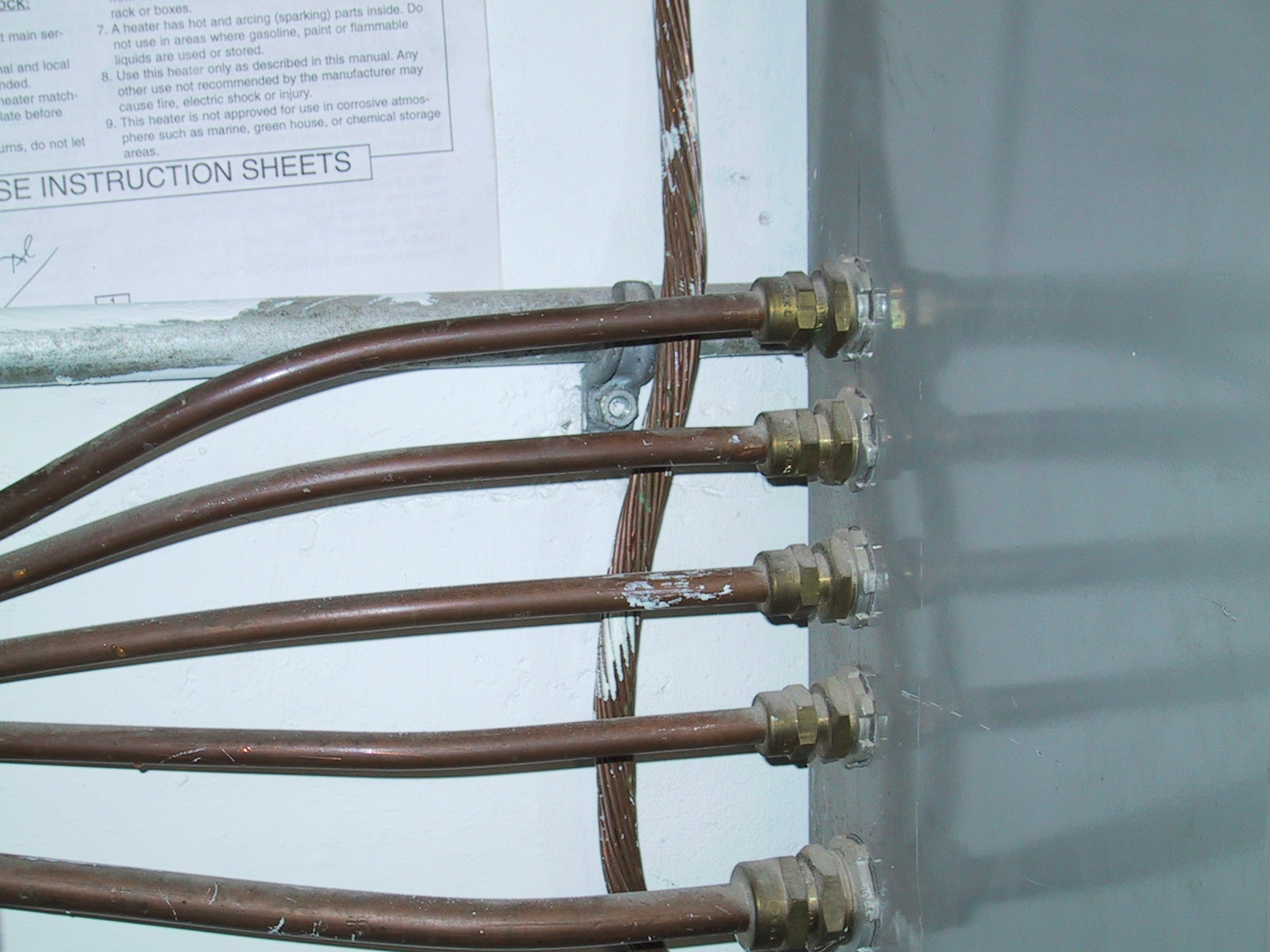
Mineral-insulated cables at a panel board

Mineral-insulated copper-clad cable is a variety of electrical cable made from copper conductors inside a copper sheath, insulated by inorganic magnesium oxide powder. The name is often abbreviated to MICC or MI cable, and colloquially known as pyro (because the original manufacturer and vendor for this product in the UK was a company called Pyrotenax). A similar product sheathed with metals other than copper is called mineral-insulated metal-sheathed (MIMS) cable.

== Construction ==
MI cable is made by placing copper rods inside a circular copper tube and filling the spaces with dry magnesium oxide powder. The overall assembly is then pressed between rollers to reduce its diameter (and increase its length). Up to seven conductors are often found in an MI cable, with up to 19 available from some manufacturers.

Since MI cables use no organic material as insulation (except at the ends), they are more resistant to fires than plastic-insulated cables. MI cables are used in critical fire protection applications such as alarm circuits, fire pumps, and smoke control systems. In process industries handling flammable fluids MI cable is used where small fires would otherwise cause damage to control or power cables. MI cable is also highly resistant to ionizing radiation and so finds applications in instrumentation for nuclear reactors and nuclear physics apparatus.

MI cables may be covered with a plastic sheath, coloured for identification purposes. The plastic sheath also provides additional corrosion protection for the copper sheath.

The metal tube shields the conductors from electromagnetic interference. The metal sheath also physically protects the conductors, most importantly from accidental contact with other energised conductors.

== History ==
The first patent for MI cable was issued to the Swiss inventor Arnold Francois Borel in 1896. Initially the insulating mineral was described in the patent application as pulverised glass, silicious stones, or asbestos, in powdered form. Much development ensued by the French company Société Alsacienne de Construction Mécanique. Commercial production began in 1932 and much mineral-insulated cable was used on ships such as the Normandie and oil tankers, and in such critical applications as the Louvre museum. In 1937 a British company Pyrotenax, having purchased patent rights to the product from the French company, began production. During the Second World War much of the company's product was used in military equipment. The company floated on the stock exchange in 1954.

Around 1947, the British Cable Makers' Association investigated the option of manufacturing a mineral-insulated cable that would compete with the Pyrotenax product. The manufacturers of the products "Bicalmin" and "Glomin" eventually merged with the Pyrotenax company.

The Pyrotenax company introduced an aluminum sheathed version of its product in 1964. MI cable is now manufactured in several countries. Pyrotenax is now a brand name under nVent Electric (nVent) (formerly known as Pentair Thermal Management).

== Purpose and use ==
MI cables are used for power and control circuits of critical equipment, such as the following examples:

- Nuclear reactors
- Exposure to dangerous gasses
- Air pressurisation systems for stairwells to enable building egress during a fire
- Hospital operating rooms
- Fire alarm systems
- Emergency power systems
- Emergency lighting systems
- Temperature measurement devices; RTDs and thermocouples.
- Critical process valves in the petrochemical industry
- Public buildings such as theatres, cinemas, hotels
- Transport hubs (railway stations, airports etc.)
- Mains supply cables within residential apartment blocks
- Tunnels and mines
- Electrical equipment in hazardous areas where flammable gases may be present e.g. oil refineries, petrol stations
- Areas where corrosive chemicals may be present e.g. factories
- Building plant rooms
- Hot areas e.g. power stations, foundries, and close to or even inside industrial furnaces, kilns and ovens

MI cable fulfills the passive fire protection called circuit integrity, which is intended to provide operability of critical electrical circuits during a fire. It is subject to strict listing and approval use and compliance

== Heating cable ==
A similar-appearing product is mineral-insulated trace heating cable, in which the conductors are made of a high-resistance alloy. A heating cable is used to protect pipes from freezing or to maintain the temperature of process piping and vessels. An MI resistance heating cable may not be repairable if damaged. Most electric stove and oven heating elements are constructed in a similar manner.

== Typical specifications ==
| Maximum voltage | 500–1000 volts |
| Current rating | 16 – >1,800 amperes |
| Conductor cross-sectional area | 1.0 – >400 mm^{2} |
| Copper sheath cross-sectional area | 5 – >400 mm^{2} effective |
| Number of cores | 1, 2, 3, 4, 7, 12, 19 |
| Overall diameter | 5 – >50 mm |
| Minimum bend radius | 6 × diameter if less than 19 mm od, 12 × diameter if outside diameter is greater than 19 mm |
| Weight | 73–3,300 kilograms per kilometre (260–11,710 lb/mi), 73–3,300 g/m, 259–11,708.4 lbs/mi |
| Finish | Bare copper, standard PVC sheath, low smoke and fume (LSF) polymer sheath, various stainless steels, Inconel, and some superalloys |
| Colour | Natural (bare stainless, bare copper), white, black, red, orange |
| Maximum operating temperature | Continuous, exposed to touch / 70 °C; Continuous, not exposed to touch; PVC-sheathed / 105 °C; Continuous, not exposed to touch; not PVC-sheathed / 670 °C; Intermittent / >1000 °C; (The melting point of copper is 1083 °C.) |

== Properties and comparison with other wiring systems ==
The construction of MI cable makes it mechanically robust and resistant to impact. Copper sheathing is waterproof and resistant to ultraviolet light and many corrosive elements. MI cable is approved for use in areas with hazardous concentrations of flammable substances, being unlikely to initiate an explosion even during circuit fault conditions. MI cable is smokeless, non-toxic, and will not support combustion. The cable meets and exceeds BS 5839-1, making it fire-rated surpassing 950°c for over three hours with simultaneous mechanical stress and water spray as well without failure.

MI cable is primarily used for high-temperature environments or safety-critical signal and power systems; however, it can additionally be used within a tenanted area, carrying electricity supplied and billed to the landlord. For example, for a communal extract system or antenna booster, it provides a supply cable that cannot easily be 'tapped' into to obtain free energy.

The finished cable assembly can be bent to follow the shapes of buildings or bent around obstacles, allowing for a neat appearance when exposed.

Since the inorganic insulation does not degrade with (moderate) heating, the finished cable assembly can be allowed to rise to higher temperatures than plastic-insulated cables; the limits to temperature rise may be only due to possible contact of the sheath with people or structures or the physical melting point of copper. This may also allow a smaller cross-section cable to be used in particular applications.

An additional advantage of Mi cable is the ability to use the copper shield as a neutral or earth in particular situations

Due to oxidation, the copper cladding darkens with age. However, where MICC cables with a bare copper sheath are installed in damp locations, particularly where lime mortar has been used, the water and lime combine to create an electrolytic action with the bare copper. Similarly, electrolytic action may also be caused by installing bare-sheath MICC cables on new oak. The reaction causes the copper to be eaten away, making a hole in the sheath of the cable and letting in water, causing a breakdown of the insulation and short circuits. The copper sheath material is typically resistant to most chemicals but can be severely damaged by ammonia-bearing compounds and urine. A pinhole in the copper sheathing will allow moisture into the insulation and cause eventual failure of the circuit. A PVC over-jacket or sheaths of other metals may be required where such chemical damage is expected. When MI cable is embedded in concrete, as in floor heating cable, it is susceptible to physical damage by concrete workers working the concrete into the pour. If the coating is damaged, pinholes in the copper jacket may develop, causing premature failure of the system.

While the length of the MI cable is very tough, at some point, each run of cabling terminates at a splice or within electrical equipment. These terminations are vulnerable to fire, moisture, and mechanical impact. MICC is not suitable for use where it will be subject to vibration or flexing, as in connections to heavy or movable machinery. Vibration can cause cracking in the cladding and cores, leading to failure.

During installation MI cable must not be bent repeatedly, as this will cause work hardening and cracks in the cladding and cores. A minimum bend radius must be observed, and the cable must be supported at regular intervals. The magnesium oxide insulation is hygroscopic, so MICC cable must be protected from moisture until it has been terminated. Termination requires stripping back the copper cladding and attaching a compression gland fitting. Individual conductors are insulated with plastic sleeves. A sealing tape, insulating putty, or an epoxy resin is then poured into the compression gland fitting to provide a watertight seal. If a termination is faulty due to workmanship or damage, then the magnesium oxide will absorb moisture and lose its insulating properties. Installation of MI cable takes more time than installation of a PVC-sheathed armoured cable of the same conductor size. Installation of MICC is therefore a costly task.

MI cable is only manufactured with ratings up to 1000 volts.

The magnesium oxide insulation has a high affinity for moisture. Moisture introduced into the cable can cause electrical leakage from the internal conductors to the metal sheath. Moisture absorbed at a cut end of the cable may be driven off by heating the cable. If the MI cable jacket has been damaged, the magnesium oxide will wick moisture into the cable, and it will lose its insulating properties, causing shorts to the copper cladding and thence to earth. It is often necessary to remove 0.5 to 2 metres (1.6 to 6.6 ft) of the MI cable and splice in a new section to accomplish the repair. Depending on the size and number of conductors, a single termination can be a large undertaking to repair.

== Alternatives ==
Circuit integrity for conventional plastic-insulated cables requires additional measures to obtain a fire-resistance rating or to lower the flammability and smoke contributions to a minimum degree acceptable for certain types of construction. Sprayed-on coatings or flexible wraps cover the plastic insulation to protect it from flame and reduce its flame-spreading ability. However, since these coatings reduce the heat dissipation of the cables, often they must be rated for less current after application of fire-resistant coatings. This is called current capacity derating. It can be tested through the use of IEEE 848 Standard Procedure for the Determination of the Ampacity Derating of Fire-Protected Cables.

== See also ==
- Listing and approval use and compliance
- Passive fire protection
- Circuit integrity
- Fireproofing
- Cable tray
- Copper wire and cable
