= MICC =

MICC may refer to:

- Military-industrial-congressional complex
- Millicom International Cellular S.A., which trades on the Nasdaq Stock Market under the symbol 'MICC'.
- Mineral-insulated copper-clad cable
- Manchester International Conference Centre, a conference centre in Manchester, England.
- McNeil Island Corrections Center, a former prison
- Ministry of Immigration and Cultural Communities (Quebec)
