= Fireproofing =

Rendering an object resistant to fire

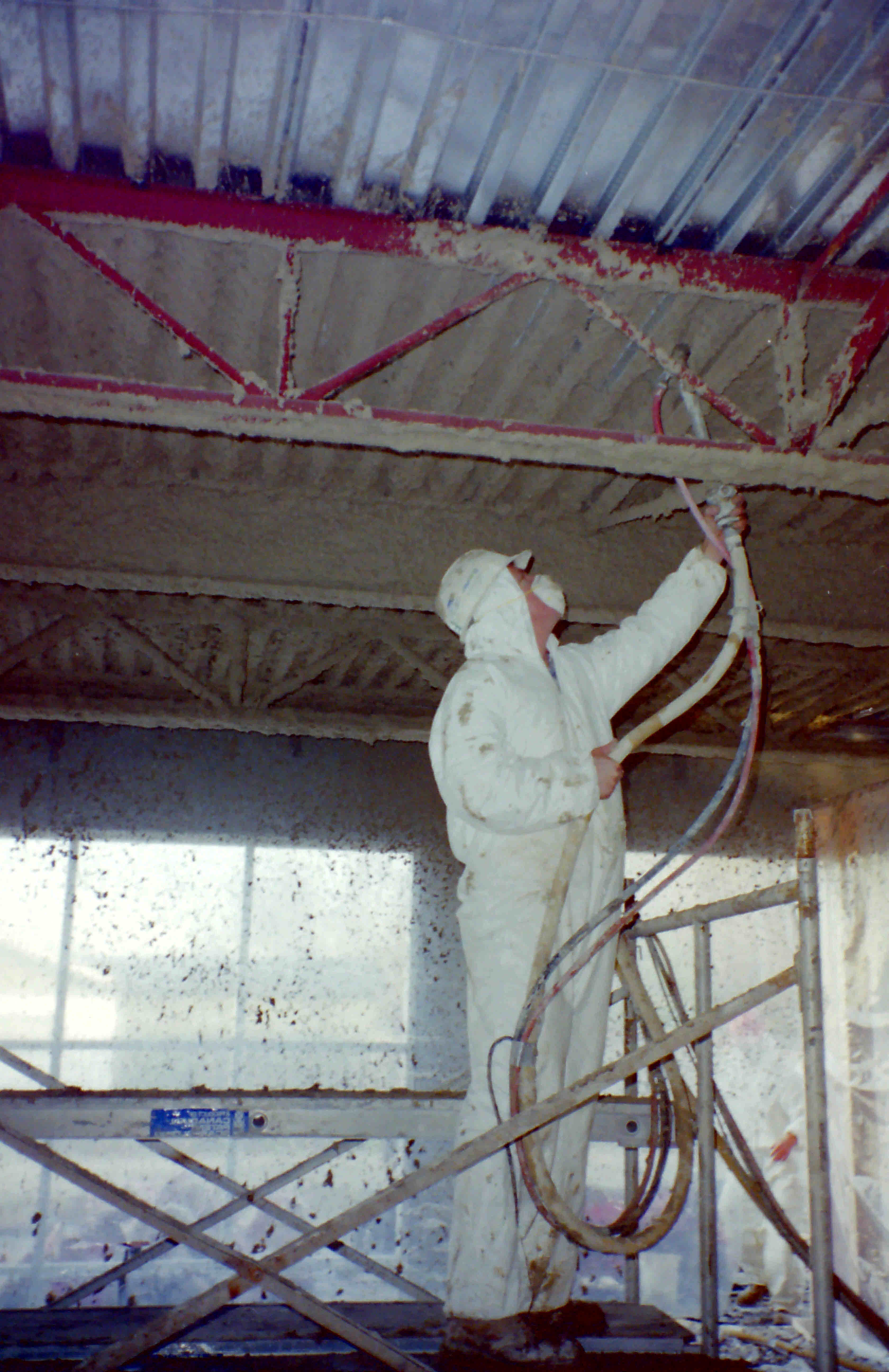
Spray gypsum-based plaster fireproofing being installed.

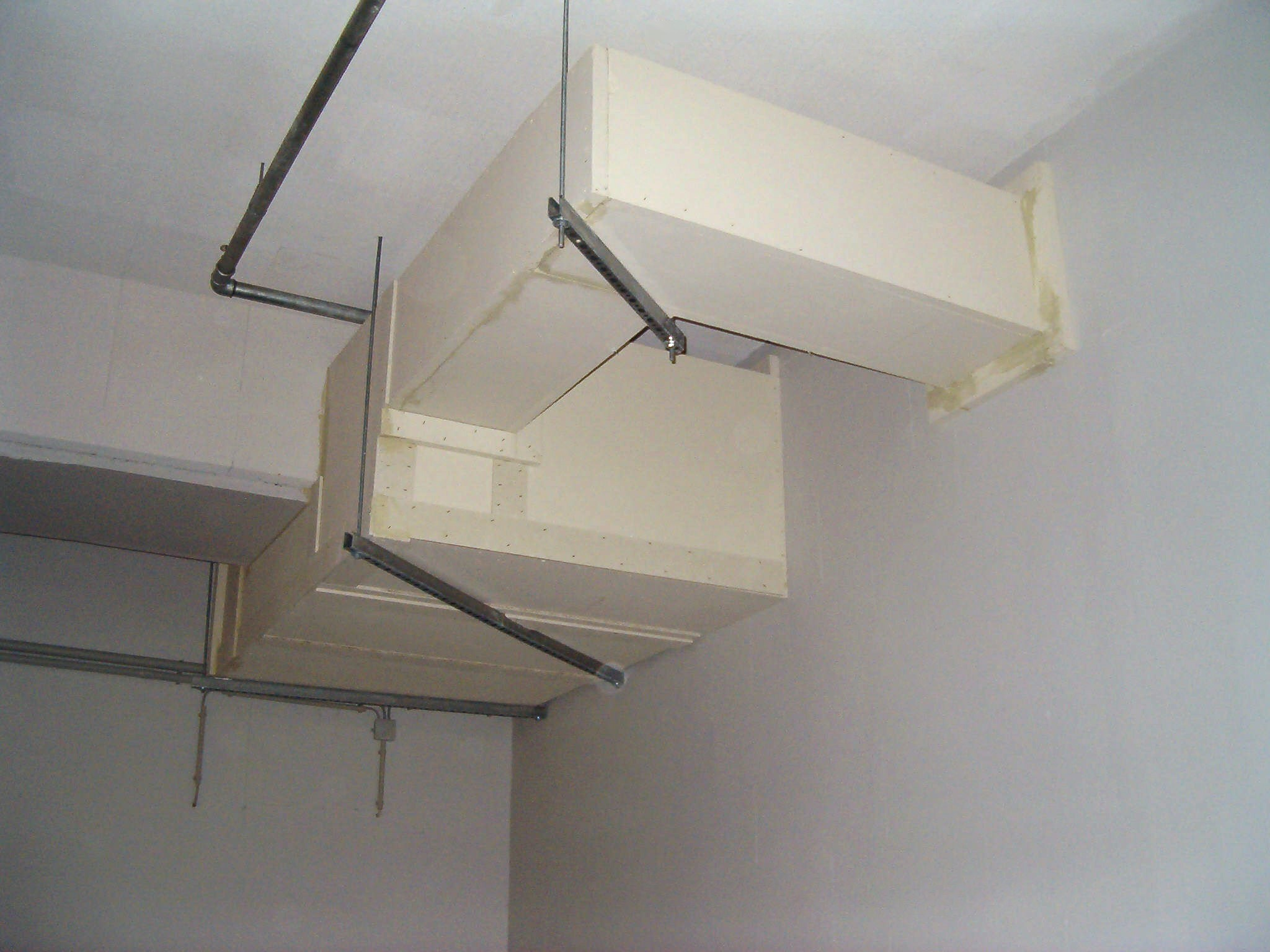
Circuit integrity fireproofing of cable trays, using calcium silicate boards.

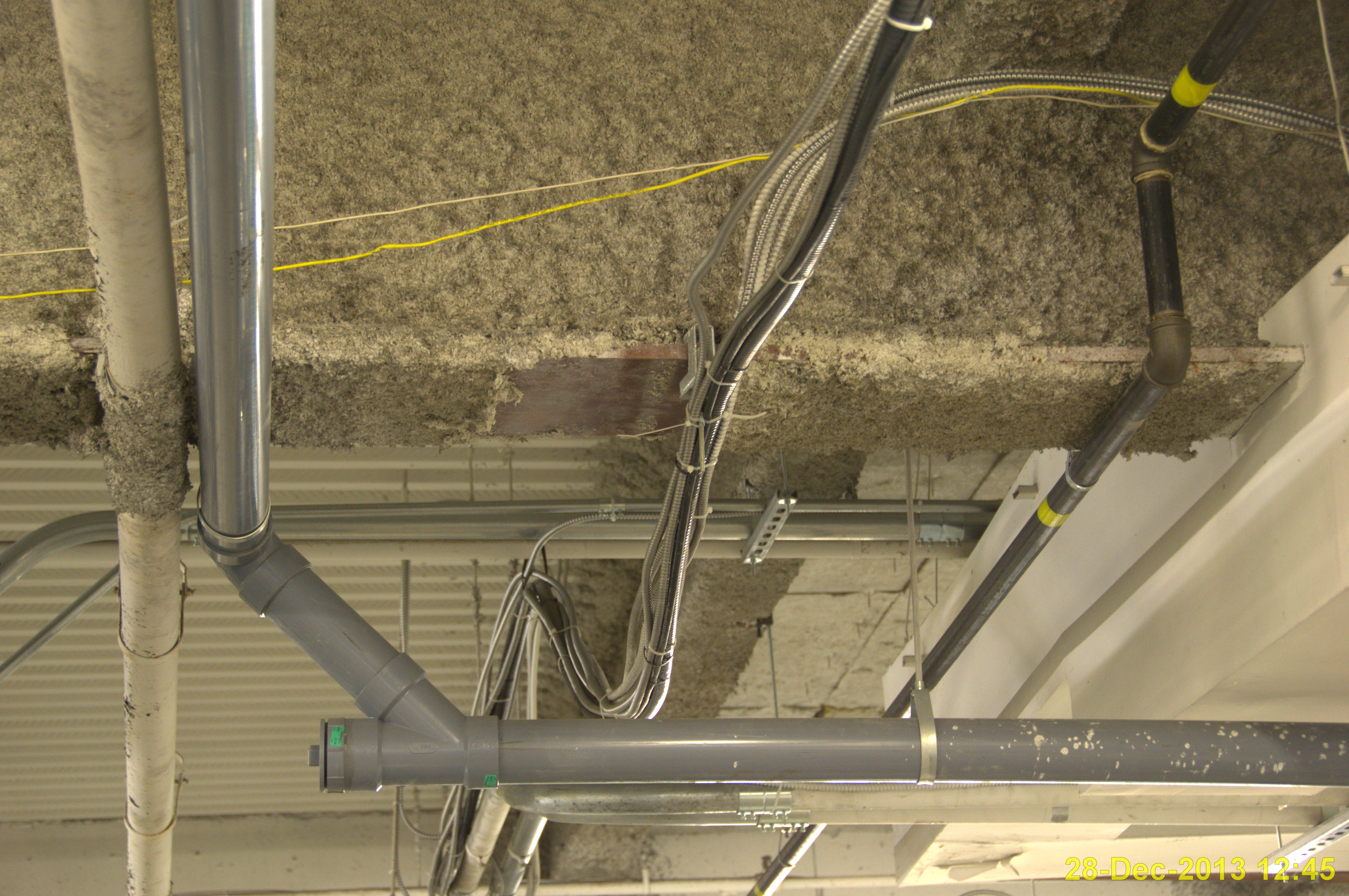
Damaged spray fireproofing

Fireproofing is rendering something (structures, materials, etc.) resistant to fire, or incombustible; or material for use in making anything fire-proof. It is a passive fire protection measure. "Fireproof" or "fireproofing" can be used as a noun, verb or adjective; it may be hyphenated ("fire-proof").

Applying a certification listed fireproofing system to certain structures allows them to have a fire-resistance rating. The term "fireproofing" may be used in conjunction with standards, as reflected in common North American construction specifications. An item classed as fireproof is resistant in specified circumstances, and may burn or be rendered inoperable by fire exceeding the intensity or duration that it is designed to withstand.

== Markets ==
- Commercial construction
- Residential construction
- Industrial construction
- Marine (ships)
- Offshore construction
- Aerodynamics
- Tunnel concrete walls and ceilings or linings
- Under- and above-ground mining operations

== Applications ==
- Structural steel to keep below critical temperature ca. 540 °C
- Electrical circuits to keep critical electrical circuits below 140 °C so they stay operational
- Liquified petroleum gas containers to prevent a BLEVE (boiling liquid expanding vapour explosion)
- Vessel skirts and pipe bridges in an oil refinery or chemical plant to keep the structural steel below critical temperature ca. 540°
- Concrete linings of traffic tunnels
- Fireblocking: In a wood frame construction, gaps are created by joists or studs in floor or wall partitions. These hollow spaces allow fire to travel easily from one area to another. Fireblocks are installed internally to divide these areas into smaller intervals. Common materials used include solid lumber, plywood, OSB, Particle board, gypsum board, cement fiberboard, or glass fiber insulation batts.
- Firewall (construction) is a common method employed to separate a building into small units to restrict or delay the spread of fire from one section to the next. Fire walls usually extend the full length of a building, from foundation to roof.
- Fire barriers and fire partitions: They are similar to fire walls in operation; however, their height is limited to a single floor, from the slab of one floor to the underside of the next.
- Coatings, e.g. to fireproof wood.

== History ==
Asbestos was one material historically used for fireproofing, either on its own, or together with binders such as cement, either in sprayed form or in pressed sheets, or as additives to a variety of materials and products, including fabrics for protective clothing and building materials. Because the material was later proven to cause cancer, a large removal-and-replacement industry has been established.

Endothermic materials have also been used to a large extent and are still in use today, such as gypsum, concrete and other cementitious products. More highly evolved versions of these are used in aerodynamics, intercontinental ballistic missiles (ICBMs) and re-entry vehicles, such as the Space Shuttles.

== Fireproofing of structural steel ==
In a building fire, structural steel loses strength as the temperature increases. In order to maintain the structural integrity of the steel frame, several fireproofing measurements are taken:

- restrictions on the amount of exposed steel set by building codes.
- encasing structural steel in brick masonry or concrete to delay exposure to high temperatures.

Historically, these masonry encasement methods use large amounts of heavy materials, thus greatly increasing the load to the steel frame. Newer materials and methods have been developed to resolve this issue. The following lists both older and newer methods of fireproofing steel beams (i-beams):

- complete encasement in concrete square column.
- wrapping the i-beam in a thin layer of metal lath and then covering it with gypsum plaster. This method is effective because gypsum plaster contains water crystals that are heat resistant.
- applying multiple layers of gypsum board around the i-beam.
- applying spray-on fireproofing around the i-beam. Also called spray-applied fire-resistive materials (SFRM) using air pressured spray gun, which can be made from gypsum plaster, mineral fibers mixed with inorganic binder or a cementitious formula using magnesium oxychloride cement.
- enclosing the i-beam in sheet metal and fill with loose insulation.
- hollow columns filled with liquid water or antifreeze. When part of the column is exposed to fire, the heat is dissipated throughout by the convection property of the liquid.
- encasing the i-beam in rigid concrete slab.
- a layer of suspended plaster ceiling isolating the i-beam

== Alternative methods ==
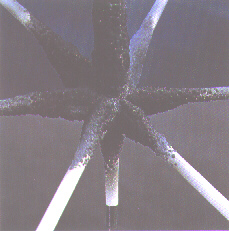
Intumescent spray fireproofing product has expanded.

Among the conventional materials, spray fireproofing plasters are widely used, including:

- Gypsum plasters
- Cementitious plasters
- Fibrous plasters

Gypsum plasters may include chemical additives that create bubbles by releasing carbon dioxide, thus reducing the bulk density. Lightweight, shredded polystyrene beads may be pre-mixed into the plaster to reduce its density. Mineral plasters can be classified in the non-combustible building material classes of the European standard EN 13501-1, A1 (no combustible components) and A2 (with combustible components), with supplementary ratings for smoke production (s1–s3) and dripping (d0–d2); for example, Knauf's lime-based spray plaster Raumklima Spritzputz is rated A1, and its lime-based trowel plaster Raumklima Scheibenputz is rated A2-s1, d0. Fibrous plasters contain a matrix of mineral wool or cellulosic fibres; the large amount of air entrained between the fibres is difficult to transfer heat through, giving the low-density material higher thermal efficiency per unit thickness.

Proprietary boards and sheets made of gypsum, calcium silicate, or vermiculite, and mechanically-bonded composite boards made of punched sheet metal and fibre-reinforced cement have all been used to protect structural steel and other building elements for increased fire resistance.

An alternative method to keep building steel temperature below the critical strength limit is to use liquid convection cooling in hollow structural members. This method was patented in the 19th century although the first prominent example was 89 years later.

== Traffic tunnels ==
Traffic tunnels may be traversed by vehicles carrying flammable goods, such as petrol, liquefied petroleum gas and other hydrocarbons, which are known to cause a very rapid temperature rise and high ultimate temperatures in case of a fire (see the hydrocarbon curves in fire-resistance rating). Where hydrocarbon transports are permitted in tunnel construction and operations, accidental fires may occur, resulting in the need for fireproofing of traffic tunnels with concrete linings.

=== Concrete exposed to hydrocarbon fires ===
Concrete cannot, by itself, withstand severe hydrocarbon fires. In the Channel Tunnel that connects the United Kingdom and France, an intense fire broke out and reduced the concrete lining in the undersea tunnel down to about 50 mm. In ordinary building fires, concrete typically achieves excellent fire-resistance ratings, unless it is too wet, which can cause it to crack and explode. For unprotected concrete, the sudden endothermic reaction of the hydrates and unbound humidity inside the concrete generates pressure high enough to spall off the concrete, which falls in small pieces on the floor of the tunnel. Humidity probes are inserted into all concrete slabs that undergo fire testing to test for this, even for the less severe building elements curve (DIN4102, ASTM E119, BS476, or ULC-S101). The need for fireproofing was demonstrated, among other fire protection measures, in the European "Eureka" Fire Tunnel Research Project, which gave rise to building codes for the trade to avoid the effects of such fires upon traffic tunnels. Cementitious spray fireproofing must be certification-listed and applied in the field as per that listing, using a hydrocarbon fire test curve such as the one used in UL1709.

== Fireproof vaults ==
Fireproof vaults protecting paper documents are built of concrete or masonry. The Municipal Code of Chicago, in its flammable-liquids chapter, defines a standard fireproof vault as a room whose walls, floor and ceilings are built of reinforced concrete or masonry of not less than two-hour fire-resistive construction. NFPA 232, a U.S. standard for the protection of records, defines a standard records vault as a completely fire-resistive enclosure used exclusively for records storage, and requires that its walls be noncombustible and of fire-resistive construction throughout. In the event of a fire, steam is released into the chamber of a concrete vault, rapidly raising the temperature to 212 °F (100 °C) and the relative humidity to 100%.

Concrete vaults are not listed for the storage of non-paper media, because the steam that concrete releases in a fire drives the interior beyond the temperature and humidity limits that the UL 72 test procedure sets for media. The UL 72 classification of records-protection equipment, as restated in NFPA 232, sets the interior temperature and relative-humidity limits that must not be exceeded during the rated time of a standard fire test, the three classes being:

Class 350: 350 °F (176.7 °C) at 100% relative humidity for paper records, which keeps the contents below the charring point of 420 °F (215.6 °C);
Class 150: 150 °F (65.6 °C) at 85% relative humidity for photographic, magnetic, or similar non-paper records;
Class 125: 125 °F (51.7 °C) at 80% relative humidity for the more heat-sensitive floppy disks.

A safe rated UL Class 150 or UL Class 125 and intended to hold only computer media is sometimes called a media safe, and Class 125 units are also known as data safes.

NFPA 232 requires that the vault door be a listed vault door with a fire-resistive rating that meets or exceeds that of the vault walls. Wall penetrations must be sealed to prevent the intrusion of smoke, heat, flame, or water, with a listed fire-rated through-penetration assembly for general penetrations and listed fire-rated material for penetrations for sprinkler piping, electric lighting, conduit, and power-limited circuits, in each case with a rating that meets or exceeds that of the vault. Ventilation openings must be as small as possible, protected to maintain the required rating of the wall, and fitted with smoke dampers activated by automatic sensing devices.

Paper water-damaged in a fire can be remediated by vacuum freeze-drying, in which water is sublimed from the liquid state to a vapor, causing less ink bleeding and planar distortion than air or desiccant drying. After a fire at the Washington National Records Center, unclassified, non-privacy-protected, water-damaged records were frozen on site and vacuum freeze-dried off site; most of the paper-based records looked essentially the same after drying.

== See also ==
- BLEVE
- Brominated flame retardant
- Cable tray
- Channel tunnel
- Circuit integrity
- Combustibility and flammability
- Compartmentalisation
- Construction
- Endothermic
- Fire
- Fire protection
- Fire-resistance rating
- Firestop
- Flame retardant
- Hydrates
- Intumescent
- Liquified petroleum gas
- Certification listing
- Passive fire protection
- Plaster
- Product certification
- Sodium silicate
- Fireproof banknote
