= Construction of Berlin Brandenburg Airport =

Work started in 2006 and opened in 2020

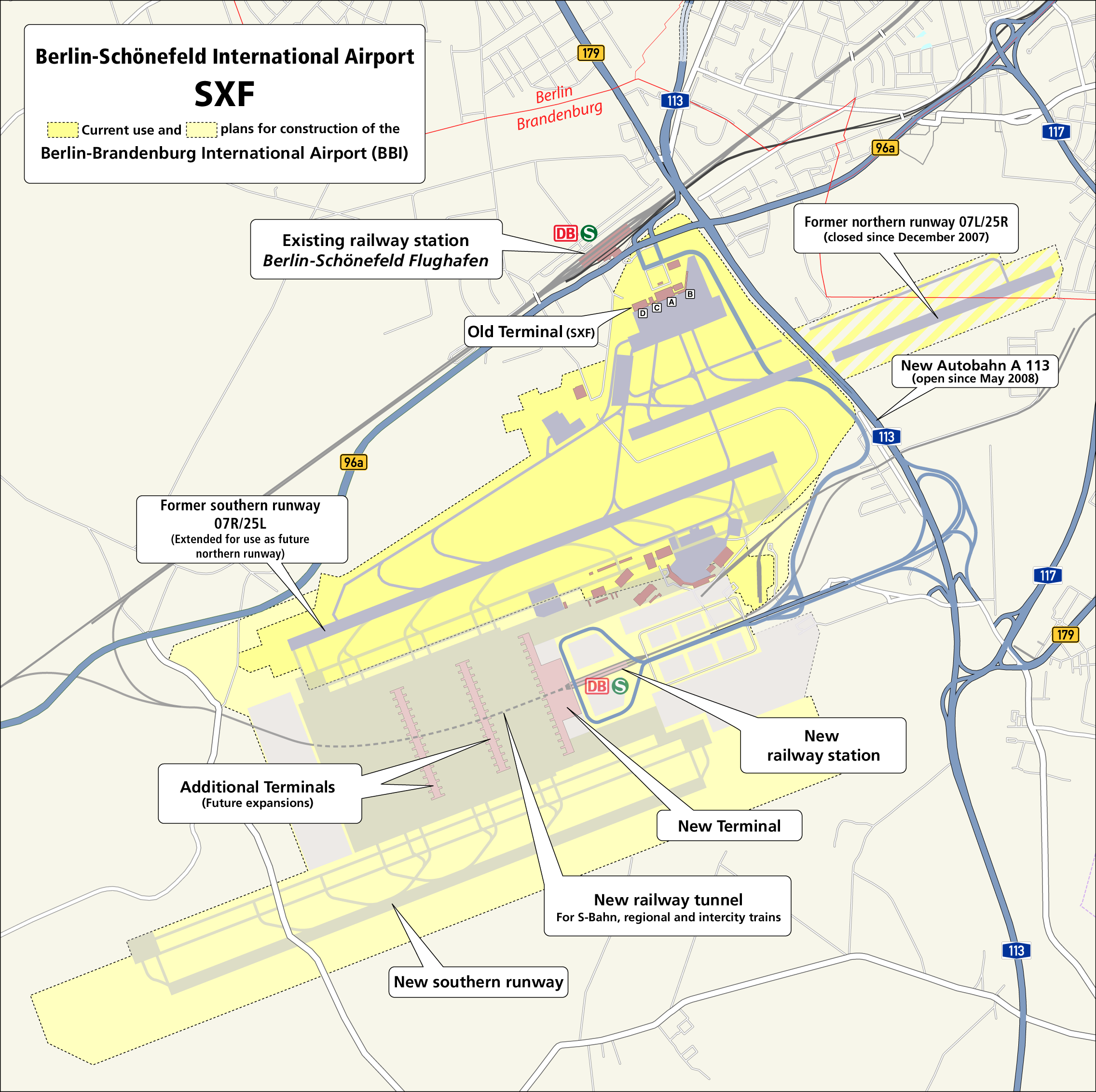
Overview of the development from Schönefeld Airport to BER Airport

Berlin Brandenburg Airport was originally planned to open in October 2011, five years after starting construction in 2006. However, the project encountered a series of successive delays due to poor construction planning, execution, management, and corruption. The Airport finally received its operational licence in May 2020, and opened for commercial traffic on 31 October 2020, 14 years after construction started and 29 years after official planning was begun. Schönefeld's refurbished passenger facilities were incorporated as Terminal 5 on 25 October 2020 while all other airlines completed the transition from Tegel to Berlin Brandenburg Airport by 8 November 2020.

== Overview ==
The construction of Berlin Brandenburg Airport suffered from continued delays which were caused by an array of issues.

The most significant cause for the continuing delays was the fire protection and alarm system. In the terminal building, the system was not built according to the construction permit and failed the mandatory acceptance test necessary to open the airport. FBB proposed an interim solution employing up to 700 human fire spotters, which the building supervision department of the local Dahme-Spreewald district rejected. Inspectors uncovered flaws in the wiring, programming and implementation of the highly complex system designed by Siemens and Bosch. The system automatically controls sprinklers, smoke extractors and fire doors. For aesthetic reasons, designers decided that the terminal would have smoke extraction ducts in its ceiling but that they would not exhaust to its rooftop. During a fire, smoke would be pumped from the ceiling into a shaft running down and through the basement below the structure. This required the natural rising behaviour of hot air in the shaft to be reversed. Achieving this on the scale necessary for this airport is a unique undertaking and so far this elaborate smoke extraction system has not worked as planned. To meet the acceptance test requirements, large scale reconstruction work of the fire system might be needed. It emerged that Alfredo di Mauro, who designed the fire safety system, was not a qualified engineer. While his business cards stated he was an engineer, he was actually qualified as an engineering draughtsman. Di Mauro was dismissed by the airport company in early May 2014. In the termination notice, the company cited "serious defects" in his work and that trust in their relationship was "now finally shattered". The airport company went on to state that Di Mauro's plans would be "disposed of". The system was to be rebuilt and divided into three areas in order to make it "manageable". The cost of this work was reported as being a nine-digit figure.

Another major factor impacting on the construction of the airport was insolvency of general planner Planungsgemeinschaft Flughafen Berlin Brandenburg International (pg bbi) and the dismissal of the Gerkan, Marg and Partners architects. Inspectors have uncovered many examples of poor workmanship due to a lack of proper supervision and documentation, most notably concerning the wiring. Reports have surfaced about cable conduits that hold too many cables or hold cables in incompatible combinations, such as phone lines next to high voltage wires. A total of 60 kilometres (37 mi) of cooling pipes were allegedly installed with no thermal insulation. To correct this, the demolition of numerous walls may be necessary. Furthermore, exterior vents appear to be in improper locations, allowing rainwater from the western facade to enter them.

== Timeline ==
Construction delays
Announcement	Opening date
5 September 2006 (original)	30 October 2011
25 June 2010	3 June 2012
7 May 2012	17 March 2013
27 October 2012	27 October 2013
January 2013	on/after 2014
8 January 2014	on/after 2015
24 February 2014	on/after 2016
14 May 2014	on/after 2017
December 2014	2nd half of 2017
21 January 2017	2018
15 December 2017	31 October 2020

=== 2006 ===
After nearly 15 years of planning, actual construction work for Berlin Brandenburg Airport began on 5 September 2006. When construction began, FBB announced 30 October 2011 as the opening day for the new facility. To make way for the new airport, two villages were removed. The 335 inhabitants of Diepensee received compensation and were offered new homes in Königs Wusterhausen, a move that was completed by late 2004. The 35 villagers of Selchow were resettled to Großziethen in mid-2005.

=== 2007 ===
In November 2007, the BER-Infotower opened a 32-metre-high (105 ft) public observation tower and information center. It was part of the airport's visitor facilities, which also had a webcam of the construction progress. The transparent and twisted structure was originally intended to be temporary, with a scheduled removal announced in 2016.

=== 2008 ===
Construction of the terminal building began in July 2008.

Tempelhof Airport was officially closed on 30 October 2008.

=== 2010 ===
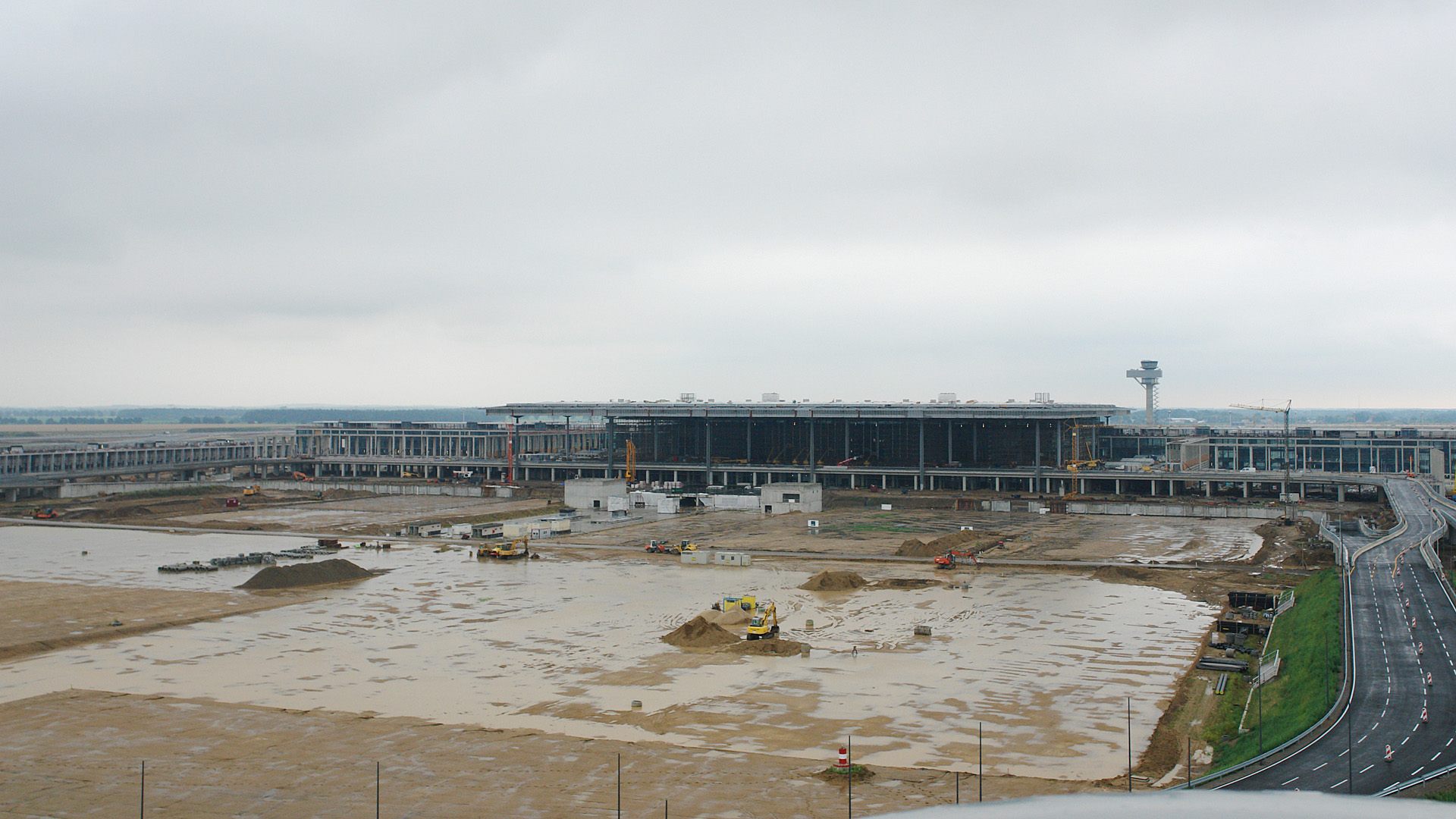
Construction progress at today's Terminal 1 as of 2010

On 8 and 9 May 2010, the airport celebrated its topping out with open days at the airport site. A few days after 14 June 2010 topping out ceremony, FBB announced that construction deadlines could not be met.

=== 2011 ===
On 30 October 2011, the railway line and terminal station were ready for service, however no scheduled trains would operate until the opening.

Operating tests and service trials began on 24 November 2011, based on the anticipated opening date of 3 June 2012. A total of 12,000 volunteers participated in simulated check-in, security screening, boarding and baggage claim. The tests used 15,000 pieces of luggage in the automated baggage processing system, covered night-time operations and emergency scenarios. This phase also saw the acceptance tests of various airport systems. It became clear on 8 May 2012 that the building could not open on schedule, officially due to the failure of the fire protection system. In reality, according to a Brandenburg State Audit report in February 2016 the usability of the airport was at 56.2%; for example, there were no ticket counters and the escalators did not work. The report went on to say there was no realistic chance that it could be used "reasonably successfully" in 2012. Legal implications concerning the failed 2012 opening were expected after the release of the 2016 report.

=== 2012 ===
As the new date drew nearer, airlines amended their timetables to reflect their plans to operate from BER. On the retail side of the airport, shops and restaurants prepared for the opening. As the airports in Tegel and Schönefeld were to close once the last flights of 2 June had been serviced, a major logistics operation for moving the airports' infrastructure was launched. Vehicles, equipment and supplies that were needed at Tegel until the final moments would have been transported to BER during the night of 2–3 June. To allow this, the authorities planned to restrict the highways linking the two airports (A113, A100 and parts of A111) to airport traffic only. Rundfunk Berlin Brandenburg, the national broadcaster for Berlin and Brandenburg, scheduled 24 hours of continuous live coverage of the airport move. A special Lufthansa flight to Frankfurt Airport, operated with an Airbus A380, was scheduled as the first departure from the new airport on 3 June at 06:00.

On 8 May 2012 just 26 days before the move, FBB again postponed the opening date. The postponement led to the cancelling of moving plans and in some cases reversing actions already completed. It cited technical difficulties, primarily concerning the fire safety and smoke exhaust systems for the delay. As a result, FBB dismissed the director for technical affairs Manfred Körtgen and replaced him with Horst Amann. It also announced 17 March 2013 as the new opening date for BER. However, this was soon met by doubts due to the large number of construction flaws and problems that inspectors continued to find.

In early September 2012, FBB further postponed the opening to 27 October 2013. Again, media and experts (most notably Peter Ramsauer, Federal Minister for Construction and Infrastructure) voiced doubts about the deadline.

=== 2013 ===
FBB announced on 6 January 2013 that the opening would be further delayed, at least until 2014; however, no definite opening date was given. Klaus Wowereit resigned as chairman of the supervisory board and was replaced by Matthias Platzeck, who previously had served as his deputy. The board also dismissed Rainer Schwarz, the CEO of FBB, on 16 January. By January 2013, FBB had announced and cancelled four official opening dates. FBB named Hartmut Mehdorn, previously CEO of Deutsche Bahn (1999–2011) and Air Berlin (2011–2013) as Schwarz's replacement on 8 March 2013.

Due to the rising passenger numbers at Berlin airports and delays to BER, concerns were voiced in 2013 that the new airport might be too small as passenger numbers at existing Berlin airports were approaching the BER design capacity.

=== 2014 ===
On 8 January 2014, FBB announced the airport would not open that year. Mehdorn stated on 24 February 2014 that it was unlikely the airport would open before 2016. In remarks made in August 2014, he pointed towards 2017 or 2018. Mehdorn announced no opening date by 14 October 2014, so a special commission established by the Brandenburg Parliament retained oversight of the project.

The initial design for the main hall, known as "the monster" to construction workers, called for a single exhaust system. Revised plans called for multiple systems controlled by 90 km (56 mi) of wiring. By 19 May 2014 Siemens had not yet designed the wire harnesses. These problems forced the initial construction budget to skyrocket.

BBI sought to open the north pier for use by three to ten flights per day as a test, though other parts of the airport would not be operational for some time. It requested that Technischer Überwachungsverein (Technical Inspection Association, TÜV) review the facility for safety and compliance to Brandenburg building codes. In its assessment report issued on 29 July 2014, TÜV found that some lightning rods were missing and that the back-up generator powering the sprinkler system did not provide adequate power. One source with the TÜV stated, "What the airport ordered was sufficient for a circus tent, but [if power fails] not for the dimensions of the terminal." The 18-kilometre-long (11 mi) exhaust system to remove smoke from a fire was also reported to be leaking.

Citing dissatisfaction with construction progress, members of the airport board indicated during their 8 December 2014 meeting that they were beginning the search for a new CEO, although Mehdorn's contract ran through 2016. One week later, Mehdorn announced he would resign as soon as the board named a successor, but no later than June 2015. Karsten Mühlenfeld, former head of Rolls-Royce Germany, replaced him as airport CEO in March.

=== 2015 ===
The search for a general planner was eventually stopped in February 2015.

On 20 March 2015, Mehdorn again faced questions from the Investigative Commission of Berlin's parliament. Mehdorn eventually ceased all public duties on 21 May 2015, citing health concerns. Berlin's mayor Michael Müller was appointed the new head of the supervisory board (Aufsichtsrat) on 3 July 2015. However, he had disagreements with Mühlenfeld, primarily over the opening date. Led by Mayor Müller, the board insisted on an opening in 2017.

A former manager for BER was taken into remand for alleged bribery on 13 May 2015; an Imtech manager was alleged to have given him bribes at a highway gas station in 2012. Imtech built parts of the fire exhaustion system.

The German branch of (Dutch) Royal Imtech filed for bankruptcy on 6 August 2015, and its parent company went bankrupt a few days later. As a result, Martin Delius, leader of the commission of inquiry into the failures during the airport's construction, stated that the planned opening in late 2017 was doubtful.

Also in August 2015, new allegations of corruption were published in the Bild newspaper. According to the paper, some large contractors filed additional payment demands after completion of their respective projects within BER, and received the complete requested payments with almost no objections. Lawyers reviewing the process stated that the high percentage of claims granted approval was unique and extraordinary. As a result, all payments beginning from the start of the project were to be reviewed. The projected opening in 2017 was declared unlikely around the same time. At the end of August 2015, though, the new airport head presented the Schüßler plan as the course of action. When Mehdorn testified before the Investigations Commission of the Berlin parliament in March 2015, he stated that redesigns to correct the exhaust system would not be completed until "after the summer break," and that the terminal will not be finished until March or April 2016.

An immediate halt to all construction efforts in the terminal was ordered on 21 September 2015 because a collapse of the main roof was imminent. This was done according to Dahme-Spreewald district's construction supervision. The shutdown lasted two weeks. Furthermore, 600 fire protection walls had to be replaced because they were built out of aerated concrete blocks that provided insufficient fire protection. The mortar was found to be inadequate as well.

=== 2016 ===
By 2016, further consequences of the low likelihood of a 2017 opening appeared on the horizon. Tegel's permit was set to expire at the end of 2017; but if Tegel was closed before BER was opened, massive disruptions would occur due to Tegel handling over 60% of all passenger traffic in Berlin. This led to expectations that pressure to open BER would mount drastically.

As of 7 February 2016, 24 opaque skylights (which can allow smoke to escape) in the main gangway required approval. The opaque skylights are part of the fire exhaustion system. FBB spokesman Daniel Abbou confirmed to Berliner Morgenpost that the 24 skylights may need "individual approval" rather than a blanket approval for all.

As of April 2016, the fire exhaustion system experienced further lapses that would delay a new issuing of the rework permission for the fire suppression system. The underground railway station also needed a redesign for the underground part of the fire exhaustion system. Incoming or departing trains might suck smoke into the station, so air flow guidance was needed to avoid this effect. However, the airport could not decide upon the method by itself, as permission is needed from the Federal Railway Authority (Eisenbahnbundesamt). The construction authority of the district of Dahme-Spreewald, Eisenbahnbundesamt, and the airport thus needed to join in the redesign effort. The plans on how to rebuild the underground part would not be finished before June. Thus, with no plans, the district could not grant the redesign permission. As such, the airport could not start the redesign effort before the beginning of July (assuming that the district would promptly check on the plans). As such, the construction process was delayed by at least 8 months. On 17 April 2016, it became clear that the district would conduct an intensive investigation into the construction plans. Airport head Mühlenfeld thus publicly demanded that the parties come to grips with their decision.

Also in April 2016, press spokesman Daniel Abbou was fired after giving "too honest" an interview. He had stated that billions of euros had been squandered, and that only someone "dependent on medication will give you any firm guarantees for this airport." On 25 April 2016, Mühlenfeld stated that "surprisingly, demands (towards a simulation of the problem) are higher than expected." In fact, the Federal Railway Authority demanded that the commuter trains be simulated at speeds up to 100 kilometres per hour (62 mph) when entering or leaving the station. This means it would take more time to simulate the exact solution for the underground railway station. The Federal Railway Authority also called for the simulation of emergency/evacuation scenarios. To prevent suffocation in an emergency, glass towers are to be built inside the railway station that connect to openings in the roof, which will provide fresh air. Mold seems to be persistent, the railway station is already ventilated from time to time by mobile fans.

By May 2016, it had become clear that an expedited approval of the underground station would not happen. Because of this, the timetable for opening had to be pushed back to at least 2018. Specifically, the airport was unable to conform to the fifth appendix for the construction permission, therefore it was declined. The airport found it disappointing that there was no quick approval of the underground redesign efforts as of 10 June. Instead, the authority stated that a filing for the fifth appendix was incomplete and insufficient. The vice district administrator for Dahme-Spreewald, Chris Halecker, decried political pressure from the airport.

On 23 August 2016, a former FBB department head admitted in court to taking €150,000 in bribes from Imtech, on a parking lot next to a highway in 2012. At the end of August 2016 it was announced that the airport had missed an internal deadline, and that the permissions for the next phase of construction could not be issued. This was because the fire protection system for the connection between the airport and railway station lacked sufficient documentation. These conditions were met on 6 October 2016. The conditions for the final construction approval would only be met on 27 January 2017.

The project management missed a 7 October 2016 deadline to announce a definite opening date for the airport. In October 2016, traffic commission chairman Burkert declared that an opening in 2017 was impossible. An 11 October 2016 committee session found that motors used to open and close windows would not operate above 30 °C (86 °F), necessitating their replacement. Three thousand smoke detectors went missing, but were later found. Technical issues involving the electric doors became public on 18 January 2017. It was discovered that 80% of the doors would not open, which created concerns around venting of smoke in a fire. The sprinkler system had sustained failures in the south pier. The sprinkler heads were replaced for increased water flow, but the pipes were too thin to carry it; as a result the ceiling needed to be opened for the pipes to be replaced. The new low-cost terminal T2 will possibly be delayed until after 2020. It was revealed in a newspaper report that the airport could not open before 2018, and that this had been known by the airport for three years despite public statements otherwise.

The main construction permit (that is, the permission of the authority of Berlin issues to construction firms) was destined to expire. This would mean all construction work would have to terminate on 23 November 2016. A new law, referred to as a "Lex BER", extended the construction permission for ongoing projects.

By the end of 2016, unfinished construction and corrective work indicated clearly that an opening prior to late 2017 was unlikely. In December 2016, Mühlenfeld hinted at a possible 2018 opening; Ryanair marketing head Kenny Jacobs suggested March 2018.

=== 2017 ===
In January 2017, it became clear that the airport would not open in 2017, with some estimates suggesting that the airport would open in 2018 or 2019, at the latest. On 6 March 2017, Lütke-Daldrup was appointed to replace Mühlenfeld as the head of the construction project and Rainer Bretschneider was appointed head of the supervisory board. The target opening was pushed to 2018 or 2019, with 2020 as a possible option. In Aug 2017 the Berliner Zeitung reported that the airport's remaining funds would run out in 2018.

As of May 2017, estimates suggested the airport could open in late 2018 or early 2019, but an opening in 2020 was not ruled out. The opening date of 2019 had already been described as ambitious and even the new opening date of 2020 was called into question. On 23 November 2017, exactly 2,000 days after the originally planned opening date in 2012, a TÜV report listed additional deficits. It was reported that that the new deficits would cause an additional delay of up to two years, with an opening in 2021. At the end of 2017, autumn 2020 was announced as the new official opening date.

The recent bankruptcy of Air Berlin was another problem for the airport. With Air Berlin absent it became even clearer that the airport would not become a major hub. The number of connections a person can catch would be immediately reduced and Tegel was too far away to be any help in this regard. Interested citizens forced a non-binding public quorum that was held parallel to the federal election, asking whether Tegel should remain open if BER was already in operation. The majority of Berlin's citizens agreed.

In November 2017, an audit of the entire airport by Germany's technical supervision service TÜV uncovered more significant lapses in the fire and emergency systems, further pushing back estimates.

=== 2018 ===
In January 2018, it was disclosed that the airport head is simultaneously earning a monthly wage and a retirement pension as a former state secretary of the state of Berlin, a situation described as a "scandal" and potentially illegal. The airport was scheduled to open in 2020 with a total cost exceeding €7 billion. The airport chief executive gave his assurance that the date would be met.

In March, it was reported that 750 display screens have already reached the end of their service life and will need to be replaced, as they were switched on for 6 years despite the airport not being open.

Planned extensions of the airport were also seen as a threat to opening in 2020, according to the airport's engineering advisor Faulenbach da Costa. More people than previously expected would be moving through the main terminal, causing an increase in fire emergency load, with even more passengers arriving through the railway station in the basement. Thus smoke systems would need to be adjusted once again. Lufthansa board member Thorsten Dirks said "the airport will be torn down and rebuilt."

Personnel changes continued to affect the project, with the head of the technical department Jörg Marks leaving the company on 19 April 2018, and Brandenburg's state secretary for airport affairs Rainer Bretschneider going into retirement in June.

The airport failed a mandatory TÜV acceptance test in May 2018, with 863 issues found in the electric wiring. Wiring remained a major issue in 2018. The all-around test was planned to commence sometime in September 2018 but it was postponed to June 2019 because the wiring was still flawed. Also in May 2018, Siemens, the software supplier for the smoke suction system, testified before Berlin's senate's airport commission stating that the airport had not yet delivered essential paperwork required for them to complete the suction software. In the same month the airport faced new legal issues as concerned citizens claimed that the aeroplane noise caused by the new airport would violate their rights to be heard. A few months later Germany's supreme court ruled that nighttime flights over BER are lawful.

In June Berlin's assembly formed a new committee of inquiry to uncover responsibility for ongoing construction lapses and to investigate possible sources of further delay. The still-unopened airport announced plans to expand with a second terminal in July, with construction to be done by Zechbau Bremen for a total cost of €200 million.

=== 2019 ===
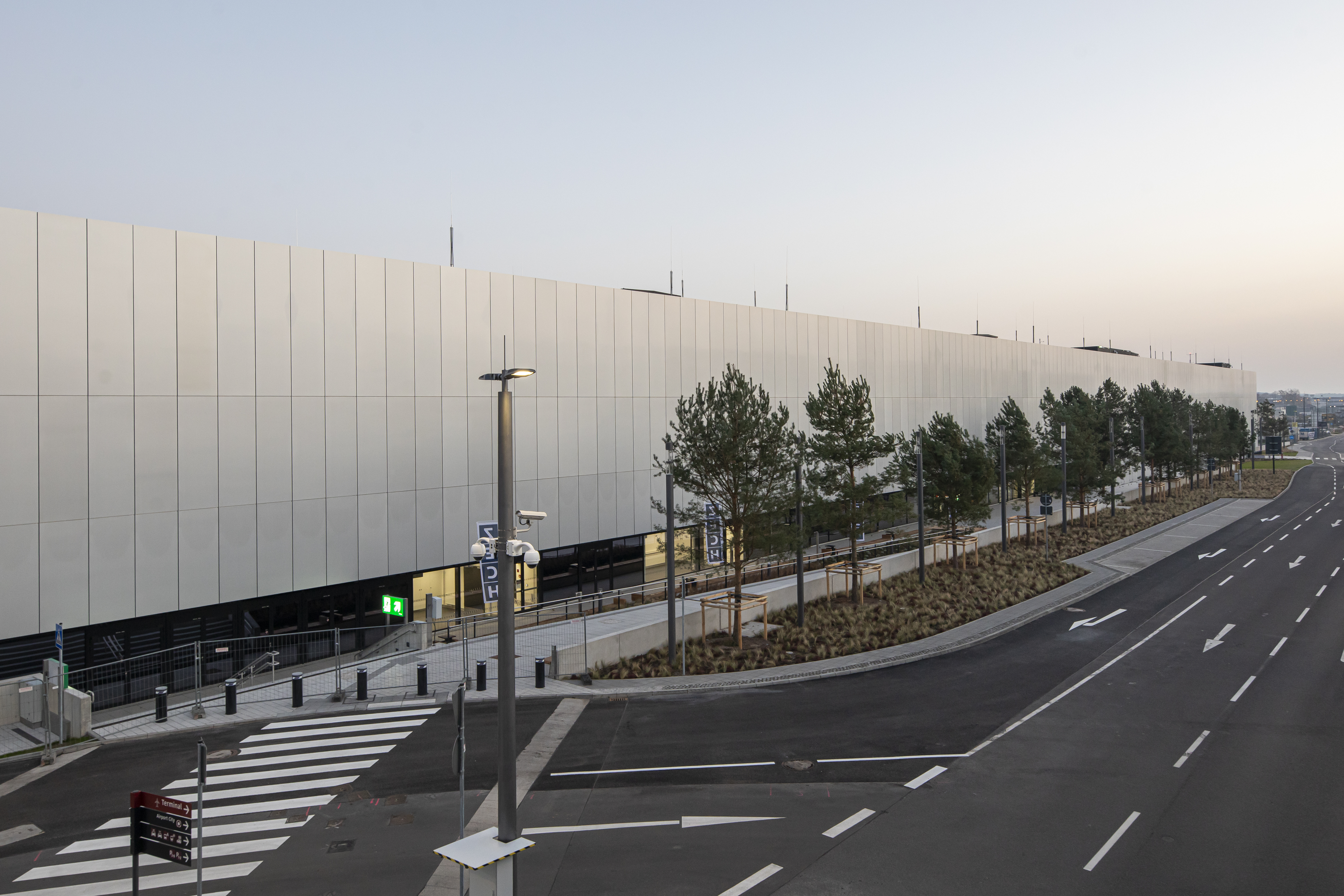
Exterior of Terminal 2, which had been added in the last phases of construction to provide further capacity

It was reported at the start of January 2019 that the construction oversight authority was unwilling to permit the Terminal's wiring as is, because it was too tangled.

Berlin's Tagesspiegel reported that Bosch (fire detection) and Caverion (sprinklers) were unwilling to participate in a hearing of Berlin's parliament on 14 March 2019. It was then assumed that the airport would not open until 2020. The fire protection malfunction was too significant to keep 2020 as an opening date.

On 28 March 2019, it was reported that a software update for the fire alarm system planned to be ready by 29 March would be delayed until late May. TÜV Rheinland warned that there were still considerable problems with the system, and stated that if there were any further delays the October 2020 opening date would be missed. On 16 April 2019, the smoke suction system nicknamed "the Monster" finally received approval from TÜV, afterwards by an expert representing the State.

In May 2019, it was reported that sand-lime brick used in the foundations of the airport were not sufficiently rated for load, necessitating a costly replacement of much of the underground cabling and reinforced concrete beams. According to a subsequent investigation the problem had been known since 2012. The problematic plastic anchors that were earlier found to be unsuitable for fire were also found not suitable for sand-lime brick. As stated by Deutsches Institut für Bautechnik, it is not possible to approve already-installed anchors after the fact. Later in May the head of the airport Lütke-Daldrup stated that "it cannot be guaranteed entirely anymore" that the airport will open in October 2020. Unapproved screw anchors made of plastic not rated for fire seem to have been the reason for the new delay.

Also known since 2012 were problems with the cable ducts: 700 kilometres (430 mi) of cable needed to be replaced due to water overflow within the cable ducts next to the southern runway. The ducts were not leakproof against incoming water, and had eroded in the decade since they were first installed. The repairs were scheduled to start later in 2019. According to airport head Lütke-Daldrup, the planned opening date of October 2020 was not affected by the cable duct problem, as the repairs could continue while the airport was in operation. German minister of traffic Mr Scheuer however reiterated his concerns that the sand lime brick and cable duct issues could delay the opening beyond 2020. Conservative party member Graeff stated that if the airport continued to see these kinds of delays, then officials should go ahead and start planning construction of a new airport in a different location.

The head of the expansion facility management cancelled his contract at the end of June 2019 for unspecified personal reasons. The construction progress at the T2 site remained slow, but the topping out of T2 finally took place on 30 July. Final equipment tests took place at the airport over the summer of 2019; with the first tests appearing to have been successful.

On 31 July 2019, construction work at terminal T2 was finished in a record time of only 10 months. Initially planned to cost €200 million, the exploding cost of Berlin Brandenburg Airport as a whole made it necessary to reduce standards and cut the cost of T2 by 50%, to no more than €100 million. The attempts to reduce costs were unsuccessful, as criticised in a report to the supervisory board. Nonetheless, Lütke-Daldrup took the timely completion of terminal T2 as a sign that the problems at BER were coming to an end. Lütke-Daldrup said that he was hopeful that the airport could open as soon as August 2020, two months earlier than currently scheduled. In late July 2019, Lütke-Daldrup stated that, of the more than 11,000 shortcomings reported in March 2019, over 70% had been resolved, including several hundred problems of high priority that would preclude the start of the final TÜV rehearsal. On 1 August 2019 a several-month TÜV rehearsal of BER's technical facilities began, marking the first time that all airport systems have been tested simultaneously.

Renewed checks at T2 yielded serious construction lapses, though. The concrete foundation needed to be partly rebuilt to accommodate technical systems, with issues in the wiring arrangement and the ability to withstand sustained usage and heat.

It was also announced that a third terminal is planned to be erected by 2029 and that €174 m for payments to advisors was not listed in the balance sheets for 2018. Brandenburg's radio station reported that certain tests that were delayed anew at the end of 2019 were what put the opening date of 2020 into doubt again.

=== 2020 ===
In January 2020, union strikes threatened to further delay opening. The union has been fighting for a general working payment to limit competition among ground personnel. By mid-February, the planned opening continued to be doubted upon because 5,000 issues still required rectification and certification by an external inspection company (TÜV) in order to complete construction by the end of the first quarter of 2020. These issues were seen as "grave", meaning that any of them could have caused the inspection company to halt operation. As of 19 February 2020, 1,000 lapses were still unresolved, 3,300 were being checked by TÜV, and 700 proposed solutions had already been rejected. About 70 issues, including the problem of unapproved screw anchors, still lacked the proper documentation to start working on a solution. Those issues threatened to delay the start of test operations that were scheduled for April 2020. The screw anchor problem was resolved in March.

In early 2020, the airport successfully commenced a volunteer-driven test run of its main functions, including processing at ticket counters. After TÜV approved the emergency and safety systems, the airport received final authority approval on 28 April 2020. Construction work officially ended on 15 May 2020.

Christoph Schaefer was set to become new technical head as a successor to Carsten Wilmsen. The position will remain vacant though due to financial difficulties. It also has been reported that the airport operations company FBB was in imminent financial trouble due to the construction issues and delays as well as the COVID-19 pandemic.

The airport finally received its operating licence in May 2020, allowing an opening date to be set. The local and aviation authorities then gave final approval for the airport to open on 31 October 2020. Plans to bring forward the closure of Tegel to June 2020 in the wake of the COVID-19 pandemic were shelved due to an estimated lack of capacity at Schönefeld's old facilities.

From August 2020, the procedure to move all equipment from both current airports to their new facilities commenced.

On 15 October 2020, all test runs of the airport's passenger facilities and procedures, which included thousands of volunteers since spring, concluded successfully after being slightly delayed by the COVID-19 pandemic.

After Schönefeld's facilities formally became Terminal 5 of BER ahead on 25 October 2020, all airlines moved from Tegel to BER between 31 October and 8 November 2020. The first flight to land at the new airport was an easyJet special service from Tegel on 31 October 2020, followed shortly after by a Lufthansa special service from Munich. Lufthansa applied a special "Hauptstadtflieger" (capital city flyer) sticker to the aircraft in celebration of the flight. The first departure from the new Terminal 1 was a flight to London–Heathrow on 1 November 2020.
