= Grease duct =

Ductwork to remove grease vapor from a building

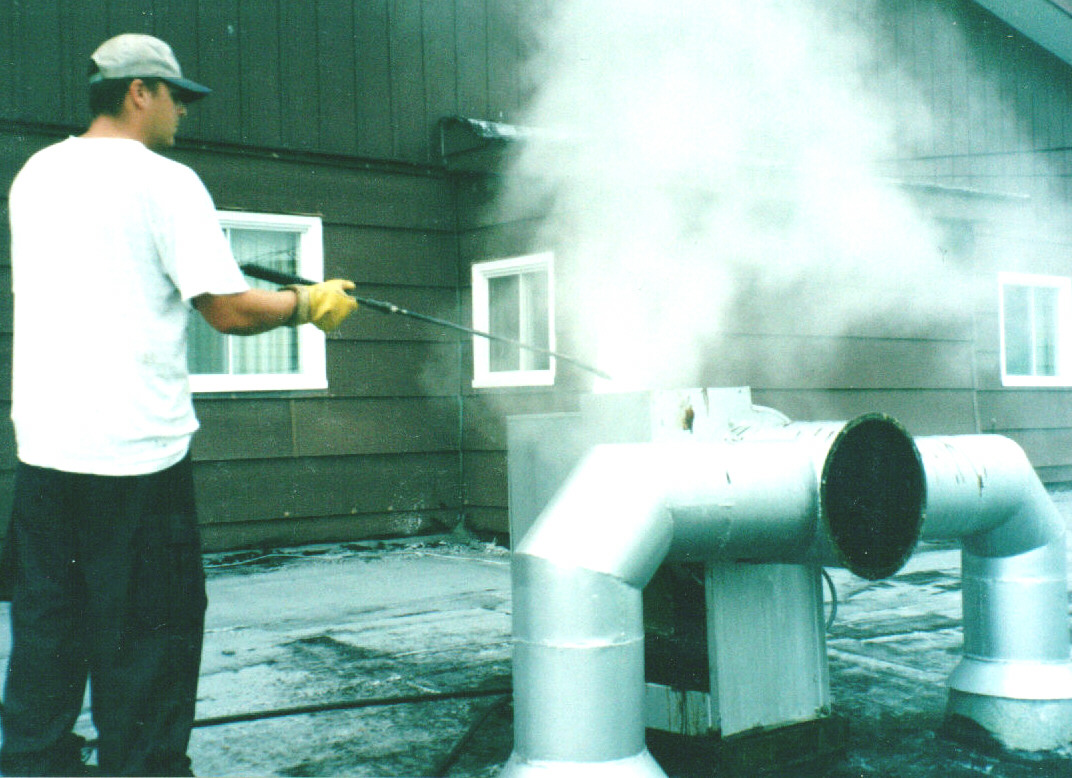
Grease duct exhaust fan.

A grease duct is a duct that vents grease-laden flammable vapors from commercial cooking equipment such as stoves, deep fryers, and woks to the outside of a building or mobile food preparation trailer. Grease ducts are part of the building's passive fire protection system. The cleaning schedule is typically dictated by fire code or related safety regulations.

== Fire hazard ==
Vapors are created when grease is heated to and beyond its vaporization point. As the vapors cool, the grease condenses and settles on colder surfaces. Grease is a flammable hydrocarbon. A fire-resistance rating is required for the construction around the duct.

== Design ==
In North America, grease ducts must be in compliance with NFPA 96 as well as the local building codes and fire codes.

A proprietary duct system that has its own inherent fire-resistance rating can be used, such as a metallic duct, either field fabricated or UL certified factory-built designs. Factory-built fire rated designs are tested to UL 1978 and UL 2221.

== Maintenance and cleaning ==
Periodic cleaning is required. Compliance is proven through certificates issued by the cleaning and maintenance contractors. Purpose-designed fire suppression systems inside the hoods must also be routinely maintained.

Hazards associated with improperly maintained hoods include, but are not limited to, poor ventilation, excess heat and smoke, and the potential risk of fires.

== See also ==
- Passive fire protection
- Duct (flow)
- Pressurisation ductwork
- Smoke exhaust ductwork
- Circuit integrity
- Kitchen exhaust cleaning
- Kitchen hood
