= Circuit integrity =

Fire resistance of an electrical circuit

Circuit integrity describes the extent of a fire's effect on an electrical circuit's operation. It is a form of fire-resistance rating. Circuit integrity is achieved via passive fire protection means, which are subject to listing and approval use and compliance. Alternatively, cable construction and materials can achieve fire-resistance ratings on their own such as mineral-insulated copper-clad cable, or MI cable.

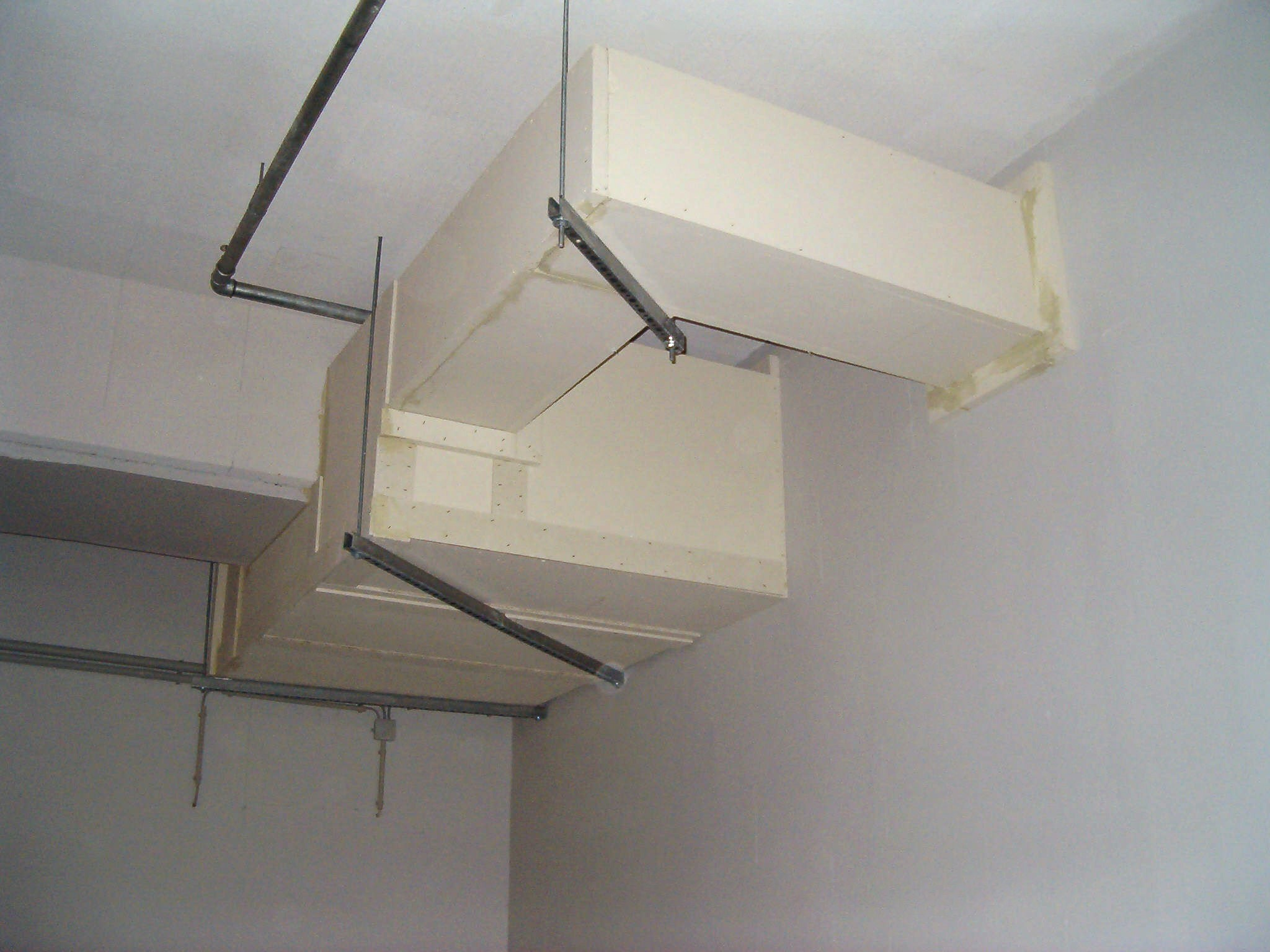
Circuit integrity fireproofing of cable trays using calcium silicate board system

Circuit integrity fireproofing of cable trays

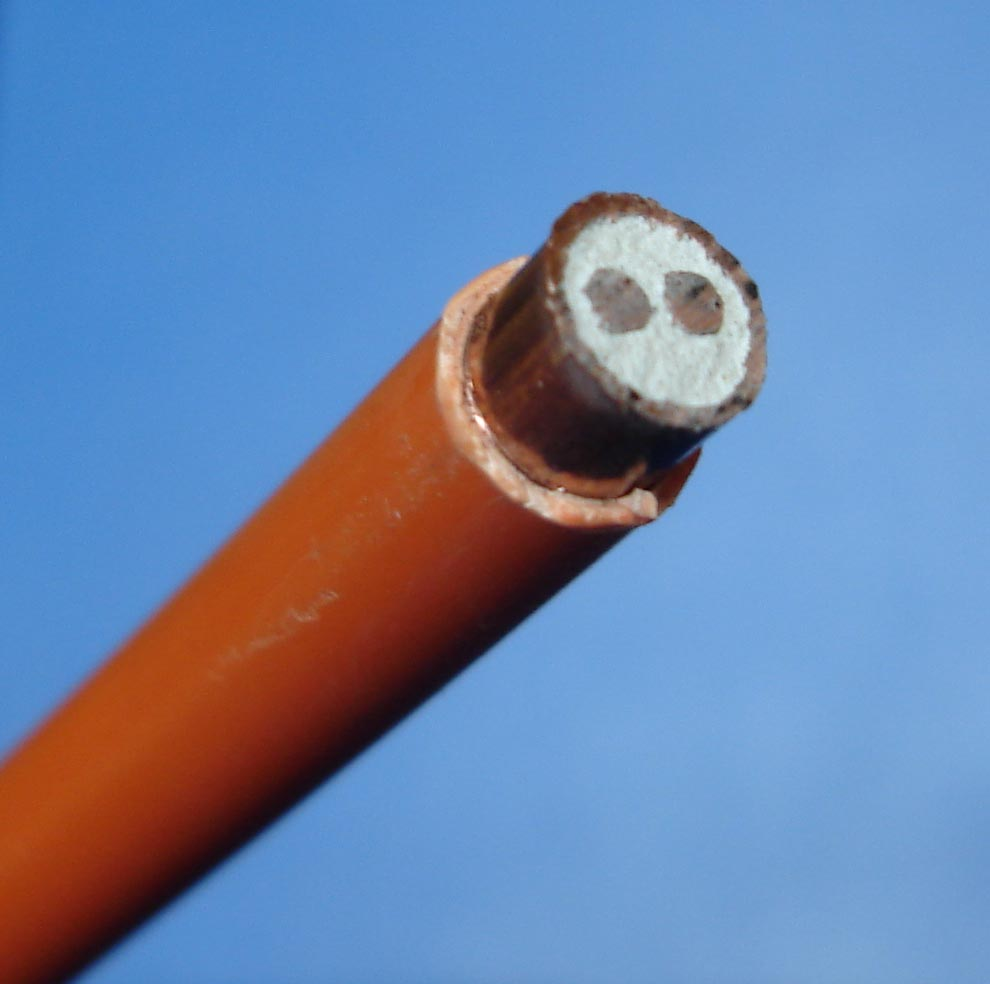
Fire-resistant cables

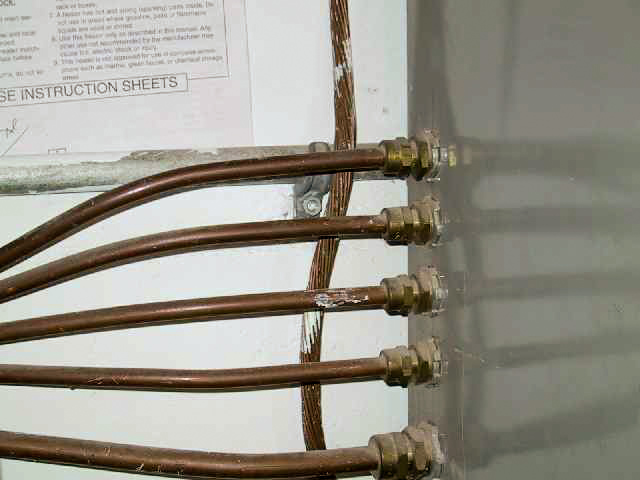
MI cables fastened into junction box that has not been fireproofed

== Fireproofing ==
Providing fireproofing for cables, cable trays, or electrical conduit, is meant to keep cables operational during a specified fire exposure and time, achieved by either:

- Cable coating with a fire retardant lowers the spread of flame along the combustible cable jacketing.
- An enclosure constructed of fire resistive materials.

== Testing and certification ==
In Canada, circuit-integrity cable tests are typically conducted in accordance with CAN/ULC-S139, which subjects energized cables to the standard fire exposure defined in CAN/ULC-S101, referenced by the National Building Code of Canada for determining fire-resistance rating.

Inherently fire resistive cables can be tested to UL 2196, Tests for Fire Resistive Cables, whereas enclosures for cables that are not inherently fire resistive can be tested to UL 1724 or USNRC Generic Letter 86-10, Supplement 1 in North America, or BS476 in the United Kingdom or DIN4102 in Germany.

For Petrochemical Industries, Offshore/ Onshore, API 2218 standards are referred as the fireproofing guidelines to address hydrocarbon fires which are more severe than the cellulosic fire profiles used in DIN 4102 and BS 476 part 20 test standards for buildings.

=== Shaft wall systems ===
Cables can be protected from fire by enclosing them in fire resistive "shaft wall" systems which are vertical and horizontal enclosures similar to ducts.

=== Current test methods ===
Germany has standardised testing via DIN4102 which encompasses both enclosures for cabling and bus ducts as well as inherently fire-resistive cables such as mineral insulated cables.

North America testing includes UL1724 Standard for Tests of Thermal Barrier Systems for Electrical System Components and UL2196 Standard for Tests of Fire Resistive Cables.

==== Ampacity derating ====
If a cable is covered with a materiel which restricts heat transfer and therefore prevents it from cooling, the elevated temperature can reduce the allowable cable power capacity (i.e., less ampacity). Derating refers to the reduction of the ability of a cable to conduct electricity.

== Cladding and wrapping considerations ==
The added weight of the wrap systems must be included in static and seismic calculations. Fireproofing of the hanging system must also be considered. Regular maintenance must be considered, as cladding and wraps are not load-bearing and can be damaged during normal building or facility operations.

== Terminals and junction box considerations ==
The entire circuit must be completely protected including termination points and junction boxes.

== See also ==
- Listing and approval use and compliance
- Fire test
- Passive fire protection
- Vermiculite
- Fire protection
- Mineral-insulated copper-clad cable
- Firestop
- Certification listing
