= Trace heating =

Temperature management in pipes

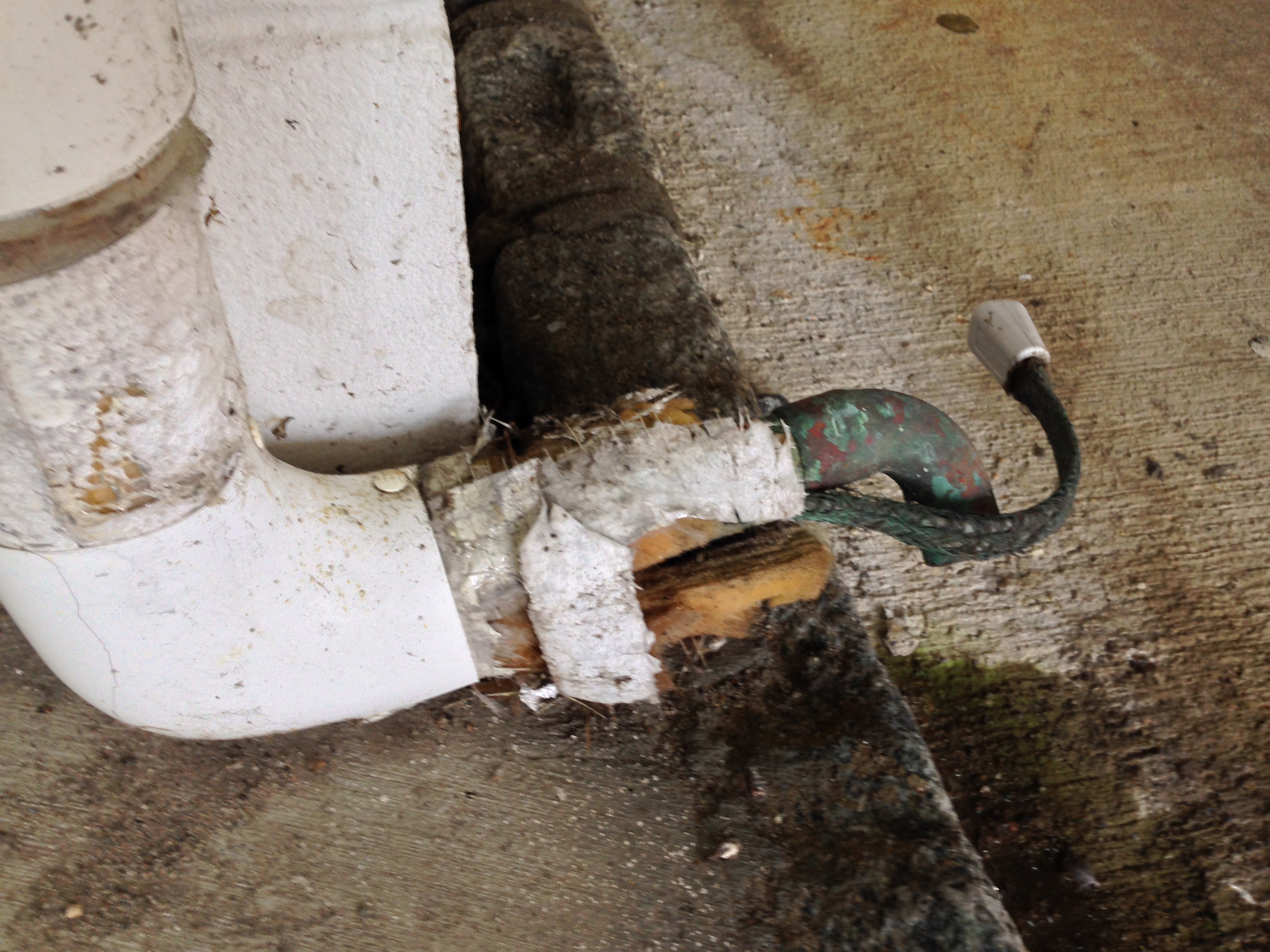
Self-regulating heat tracing tape with the gray end seal next to a copper drain pipe with insulator wrapped around them. This protects the pipe from freezing.

Trace heating is the provision of heat to piping or fluid containers by a distributed heat source. Applying heat throughout the fluid system can protect piping systems from freezing or maintain process piping at a desired temperature to maintain flow of a product that may become too viscous to flow at low temperatures. Heat may be provided by steam, heated fluids such as oil or hot water or antifreeze mixtures, or by electrical cables manufactured to generate heat when current is passed through them. Rather than providing heat at a single location within the fluid system, the heat traces the flow of the fluid. The entire system is often wrapped in thermal insulation to conserve heat.

In steam trace heating, steam from a central source is piped through small tubing wrapped around process piping and vessels. At various points through out the system, steam traps are installed to allow condensed water to flow back to the boiler plant while allowing steam to continue to flow. In a similar technique, a water/glycol antifreeze mixture is circulated through the tubing to maintain process piping temperature.

Electric trace heating uses electric heating elements to provide resistance heating by cables wrapped along the process piping or vessel to maintain or raise the temperature. The heat generated maintains the pipe's temperature. Applications include freeze protection, maintaining flow temperature in hot water systems, and ensuring process temperatures for substances that solidify at ambient temperatures. Electric trace heating cables offer an alternative to steam trace heating when steam is unavailable or undesired.

== Development ==
Electric trace heating began in the 1930s but initially no dedicated equipment was available. Mineral insulated cables ran at high current densities to produce heat, and control equipment was adapted from other applications. Mineral-insulated resistance heating cable was introduced in the 1950s, and parallel-type heating cables that could be cut to length in the field became available. Self-limiting thermoplastic cables were marketed in 1971.

Control systems for trace heating systems developed from capillary filled-bulb thermostats and contactors in the 1970s to networked computerized controls in the 1990s, in large systems that require centralized control and monitoring.

One paper projected that between 2000 and 2010 trace heating would account for 100 megawatts of connected load, and that trace heating and insulation would account for up to CAD $700 million capital investment in the Alberta oil sands.

International standards applied in the design and installation of electric trace heating systems include IEEE standards 515 and 622, British standard BS 6351, and IEC standard 60208.

== Uses ==
The most common pipe trace heating applications include:

- Freeze protection
- Temperature maintenance
- Snow Melting On Driveways

Other uses of trace heating cables include:

- Ramp and stair snow / ice protection
- Gulley and roof snow / ice protection
- Underfloor heating
- Door / frame interface ice protection
- Window de-misting
- Anti-condensation
- Pond freeze protection
- Soil warming
- Preventing cavitation
- Reducing Condensation On Windows

=== Freeze protection ===
Every pipe or vessel is subject to heat loss when its temperature is greater than ambient temperature. Thermal insulation reduces the rate of heat loss but does not eliminate it. Trace heating maintains the temperature above freezing by balancing heat lost with heat supplied. Normally, a thermostat is used to energise when it measures temperature falling below a set temperature value - usually between 3 °C and 5 °C and often referred to as the 'setpoint'. The thermostat will de-energise the trace heating when it measures temperature rising past another set temperature value - usually 2 °C higher than the setpoint value.

=== Gutter and roof de-icing ===
Placement of heat trace cable on roofs or in gutters to melt ice during winter months. When used in gutters the cable is not meant to keep the gutters free of ice or snow, but only to provide a free path for the melted water to get off the roof and down the downspout or drain piping.

=== Temperature maintenance ===
Hot water service piping can also be traced, so that a circulating system is not needed to provide hot water at outlets. The combination of trace heating and the correct thermal insulation for the operating ambient temperature maintains a thermal balance where the heat output from the trace heating matches the heat loss from the pipe. Self-limiting or regulating heating tapes have been developed and are very successful in this application.

A similar principle can be applied to process piping carrying fluids which may congeal at low temperatures, for example, tars or molten sulfur. Hit-temperature trace heating elements can prevent blockage of pipes.

Industrial applications for trace heating range from chemical industry, oil refineries, nuclear power plants, food factories. For example, wax is a material which starts to solidify below 70 °C which is usually far above the temperature of the surrounding air. Therefore, the pipeline must be provided with an external source of heat to prevent the pipe and the material inside it from cooling down. Trace heating can also be done with steam, but this requires a source of steam and may be inconvenient to install and operate.

In laboratories, researchers working in the field of materials science use trace heating to heat a sample isotropically. They may use trace heating in conjunction with a variac, so as to control the heat energy delivered. This is an effective means of slowly heating an object to measure thermodynamic properties such as thermal expansion.

=== Anti-cavitation purpose ===
As heating a thick fluid decreases its viscosity, it reduces losses occurring in a pipe. Therefore, the net positive suction head (pressure difference) available can be raised, decreasing the likelihood of cavitation when pumping. However, care must be taken not to increase the vapour pressure of the fluid too much, as this would have a strong side effect on the available head, possibly outweighing any benefit.

== Types ==
=== Constant electric power "series" ===
A series heating cable is made of a run of high-resistance wire, insulated and often enclosed in a protective jacket. It is powered at a specific voltage and the resistance heat of the wire creates heat. The downside of these types of heaters is that if they are crossed over themselves they can overheat and burn out, they are provided in specific lengths and cannot be shortened in the field, also, a break anywhere along the line will result in a failure of the entire cable. The upside is that they are typically inexpensive (if plastic style heaters) or, as is true with mineral insulated heating cables, they can be exposed to very high temperatures. Mineral insulated heating cables are good for maintaining high temperatures on process lines or maintaining lower temperatures on lines which can get extremely hot such as high temperature steam lines.

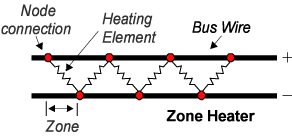

Typically series elements are used on long pipe line process heating, for example long oil pipe lines and quay side of load pipes on oil refineries.

=== Constant wattage ===
A constant wattage cable is composed of multiple constant electric power zones and is made by wrapping a fine heating element around two insulated parallel bus wires, then on alternating sides of the conductors a notch is made in the insulation. The heating element is then normally soldered to the exposed conductor wire which creates a small heating circuit; this is then repeated along the length of the cable. There is then an inner jacket which separates the bus wires from the grounding braid. In commercial and industrial cables, an additional outer jacket of rubber or Teflon is applied.

The benefits of this system over series elements is that should one small element fail then the rest of the system will continue to operate, on the other hand damaged sections of cable (usually 3 ft span) will stay cold and possibly lead to freeze ups on said section. Also, this cable can be cut-to-length in-field due to its parallel circuitry, however, due to the circuit only running to the last zone on the cable, when installing on site you normally have to install slightly beyond the end of the pipe work. When installing constant wattage, or any heat tracing cable, it is important to not overlap or touch the cable to itself as it will be subject to overheating and burnout. Constant wattage cable is always installed with a thermostat to control the power output of the cable, making it a very reliable heating source.

The disadvantage of this cable is that most constant wattage cables do not have soldered connections to the bus wires but press on type contact and are therefore more prone to have cold circuits due to loose connections caused by cable manipulation and installation.

=== Self regulating ===
Self-regulating heat tracing tapes are cables whose resistance varies with temperature - low resistance for temperatures below the cable set point and high resistance for temperatures above the cable set point. When the cable temperature reaches the set point, the resistance reaches a high point, resulting in no more heat being supplied.

These cables use two parallel bus wires which carry electricity but do not create significant heat. They are encased in a semi-conductive polymer. This polymer is loaded with carbon; as the polymer element heats, it allows less current to flow so the cable is inherently power saving and only delivering heat and power where and when required by the system. The cables are manufactured and then irradiated and by varying both the carbon content and the dosage then different tape with different output characteristics can be produced. The benefits of this cable are the ability to cut to length in the field. It is more rugged, and much more reliable than a constant wattage cable; it cannot over-heat itself so it can be crossed over, but it is bad practice to install tape in this way. Self-regulating and constant wattage heating cables have specific maximum exposure temperature, which means that if they are subject to high temperatures then the tape can be damaged beyond repair. Also self-limiting tapes are subject to higher inrush currents on cold starting up similar to an induction motor, so a higher rated contactor is required.

== Control system ==
The three phase systems are fed via contactors similar to a three phase motor 'direct on line' starter which is controlled by a thermostat somewhere in the line. This ensures that the temperature is kept constant and the line does not overheat or underheat.

If a line becomes frozen because the heating was switched off then this may take some time to thaw out using trace heating. This thawing out is done on the three phase systems by using an 'auto transformer' to give a higher voltage, and consequently higher current, and make the trace heating elements a bit hotter. The boost system is usually on a timer and switches back to 'normal' after a period of time.
