= Kitchen exhaust cleaning =

Removal of grease from kitchen exhaust systems

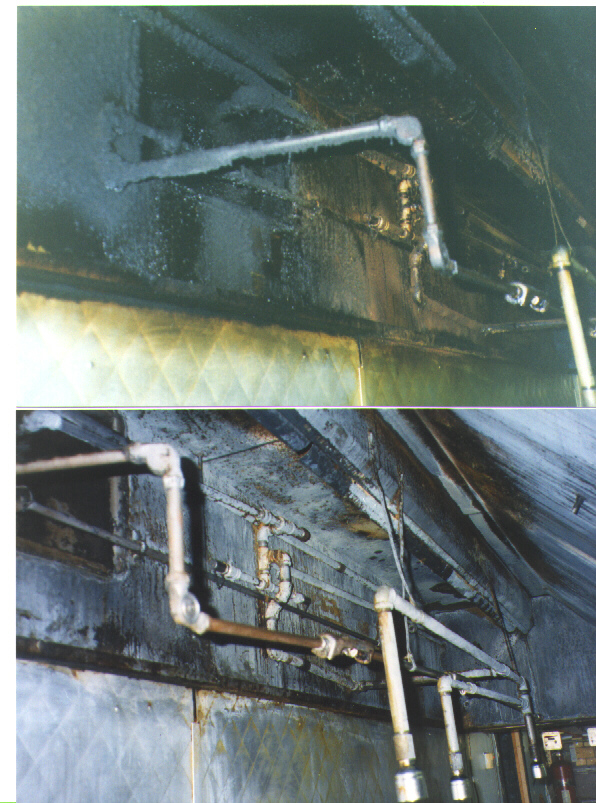
Before and after pictures of commercial kitchen hood in North Bay, Ontario.

Kitchen exhaust cleaning (often referred to as hood cleaning) is the process of removing grease that has accumulated inside the ducts, hoods, fans and vents of exhaust systems of commercial kitchens. Left uncleaned, kitchen exhaust systems eventually accumulate enough grease to become a fire hazard. Exhaust systems must be inspected regularly, at intervals consistent with usage, to determine whether cleaning is needed before a dangerous amount of grease has accumulated.

== Cleaning ==
National Fire Protection Association Standard 96, Standard for Ventilation Control and Fire Protection of Commercial Cooking Operations, provides cleaning requirements. The cleaning frequency depends on the type of food being cooked and volume of grease laden vapors drawn up through hood plenum.

=== Caustic chemicals ===
Caustic chemicals can be applied to break down the grease. After that, hot water can be used to rinse away the residue.

In extreme situations, where grease buildup is too heavy for a chemical application and a rinse, scrapers may be used to remove excess buildup from the contaminated surfaces, before chemicals are applied.
