= Fireproof banknote =

Process of making a banknote fireproof

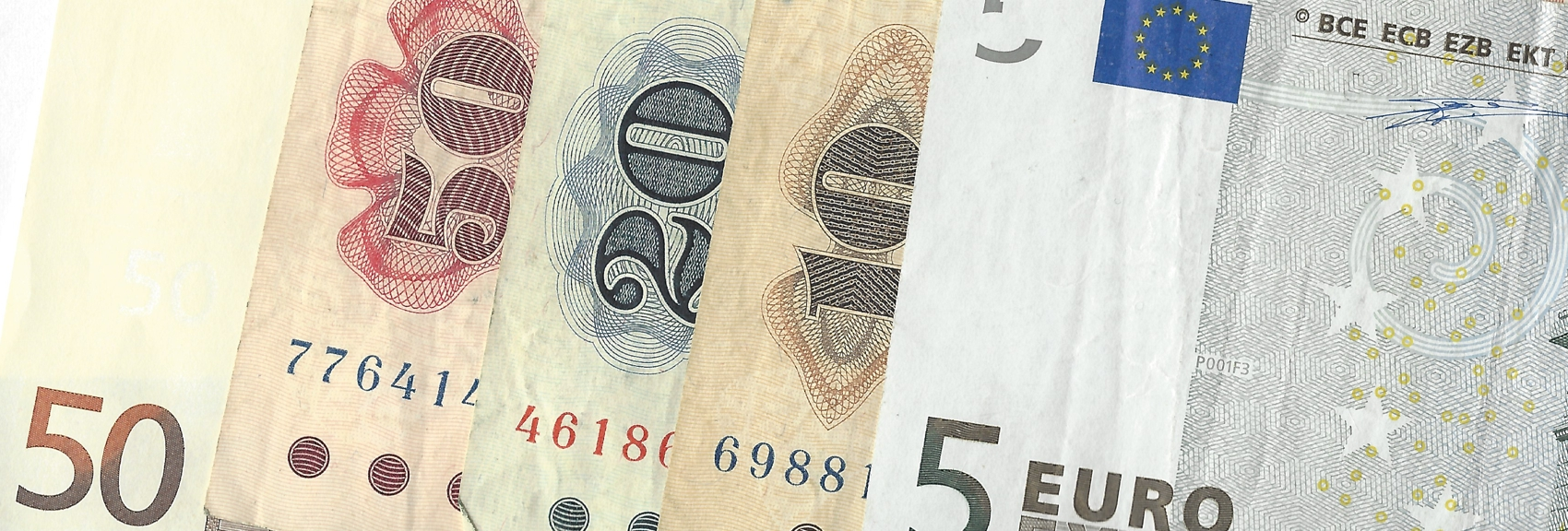
Euro paper banknotes can be made fireproof.

The fireproof banknote is a demonstration of putting a banknote, previously soaked in 50% (v/v) alcohol fuel solution, to a flame. The fire is lit and later extinguished by itself without the banknote being burnt. This demonstration can be used to teach about the fire triangle and classes of fire.

== Explanation ==
A 50% (v/v) alcohol solution is composed of 50% alcohol and 50% water in which water acts as a solvent. By igniting a paper banknote completely soaked with 50% alcohol solution, the alcohol (which is the fuel in the fire triangle) is combusted into carbon dioxide and water vapour. Contrarily water is heated up, with some being evaporated as it absorbs energy from the combustion of alcohol. The evaporating water helps cool down the system, so not all water is evaporated and the paper banknote is not burnt. The water-to-alcohol ratio should be 50% or higher; a lower ratio leads to the banknote being slightly burnt because there is not enough water to absorb the combustion energy and cool down the system.

C_{n}H_{2n+1}OH_{(aq)} + (3n/2) O_{2}_{(g)} → n CO_{2}_{(g)} + (n+1) H_{2}O_{(g)}

Common alcohol fuels for this experiment can be methanol (n=1), ethanol (n=2) and both isomers of propanol (n=3). The fire lit in this scenario is categorized as a class B fire (fire from flammable liquids), while the fire from burning paper (banknote) is categorized as class A. The alcohol-water mixture flame can be hard to detect, so sodium chloride can be added to give the flames an orange-yellow color. For safety purpose, a water tray should be prepared for emergency use in case a paper banknote caught a fire, and flammable and combustible materials should not be kept or put near the flame.

== Alternative materials or setups ==
=== Other materials ===
Euro banknotes are recommended since it is made of paper and it is legally permitted to artistically mutilate it or burn in small amounts. Moreover, there are no depictions of any persons on the banknotes.

Aside from banknotes, a similar experiment can be performed by using towels, paper or exam paper.

=== Other setups ===
==== No material ====
A solution of about 50% fuel alcohol and 50% water can catch on fire and extinguish itself in a "burning water" demonstration. In contrast to the subsection above, this can be done in a glassware without any absorbing materials like banknotes, towels, or paper.

==== No fuel ====
Tap water may be added to a paper bag which then is put on a stove to boil. The paper bag can absorb water, which cools down the system and prevents the paper bag from being burnt.

== Gallery ==
A video of fireproof banknote experiment

A video of fireproof banknote experiment

A video of fireproof banknote experiment
