= Cable tray =

Electrical-cable-supporting structure

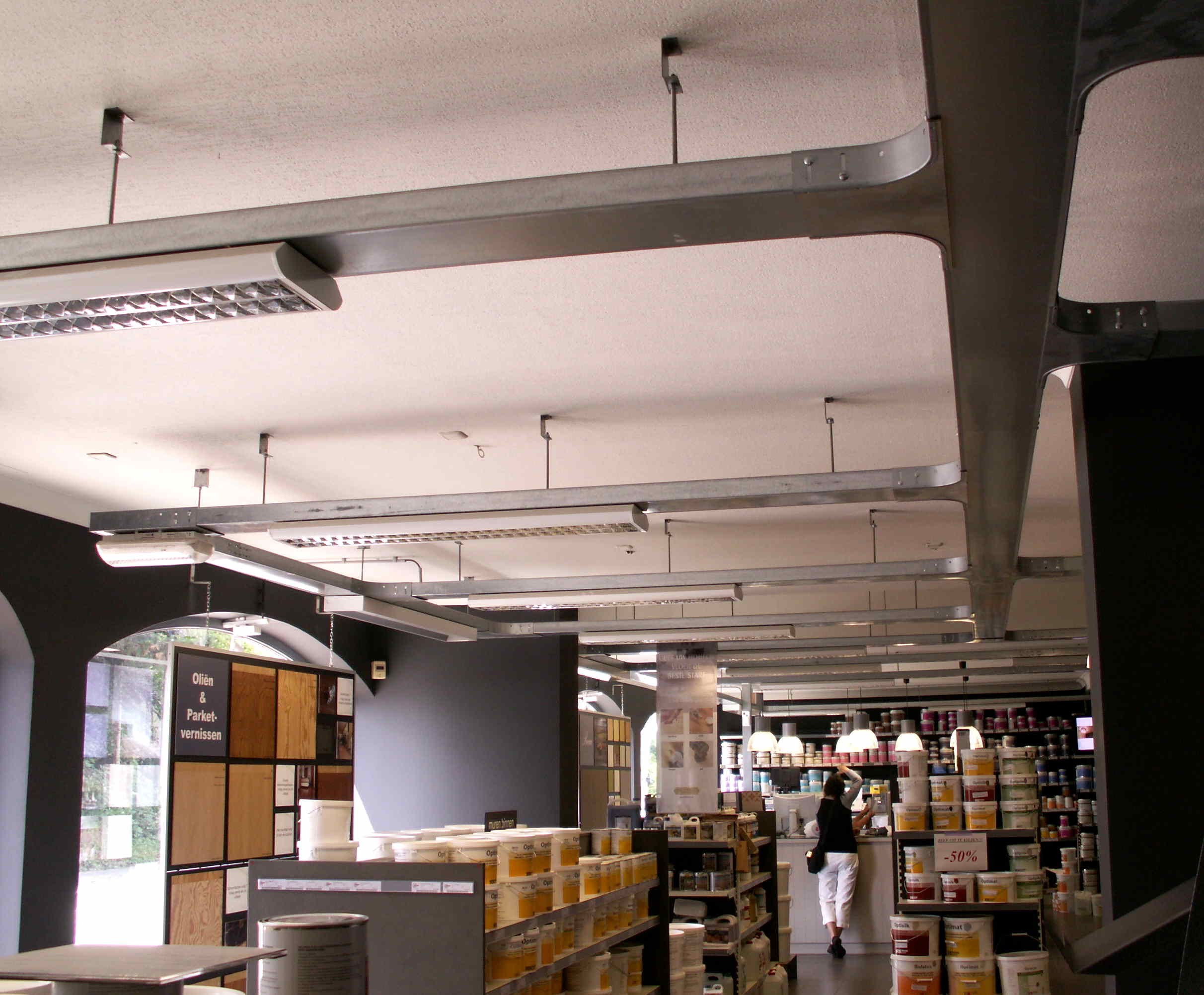
Cable trays can be used in commercial and industrial buildings

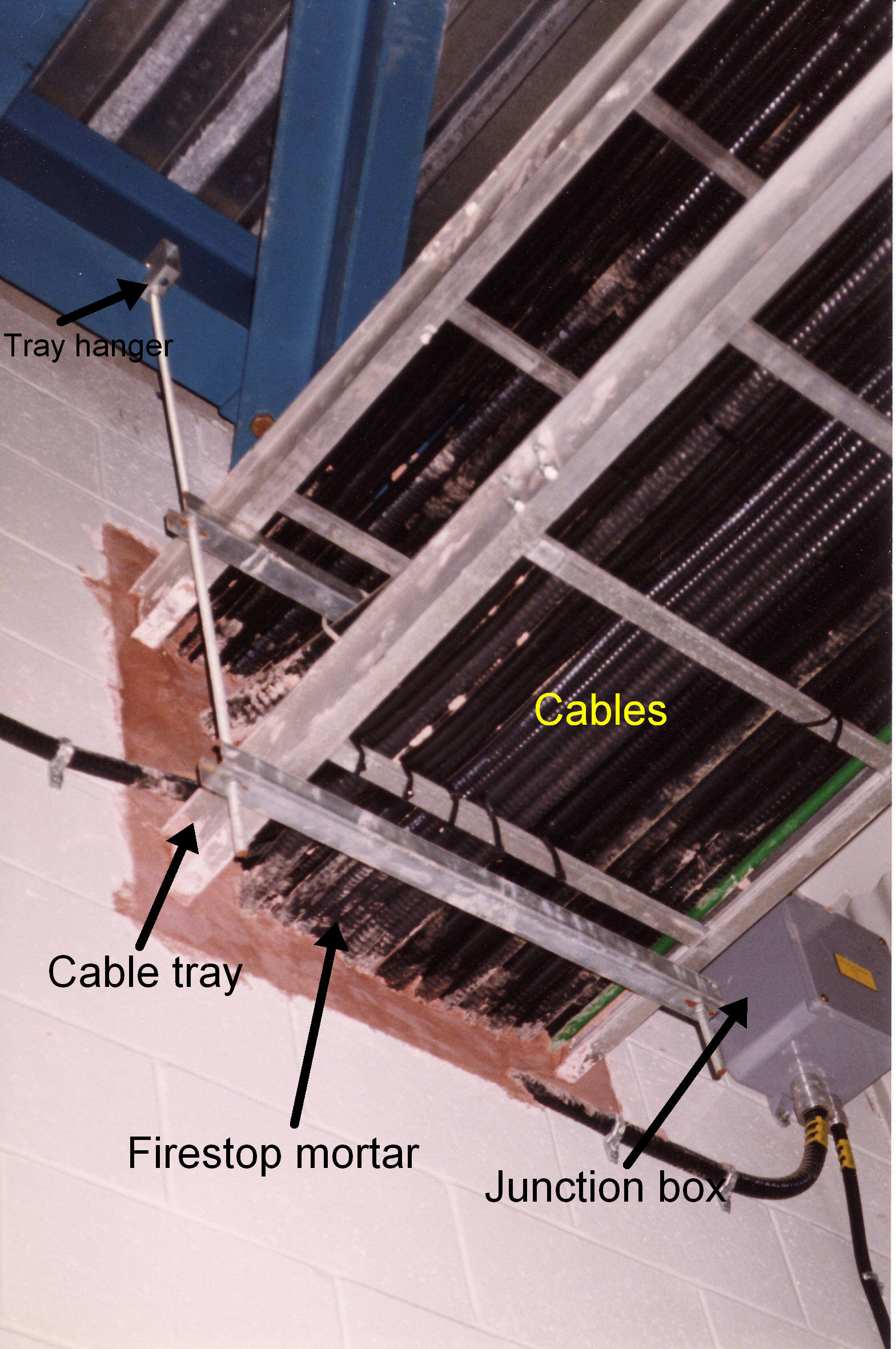
Firestopped cable tray penetration with teck cables

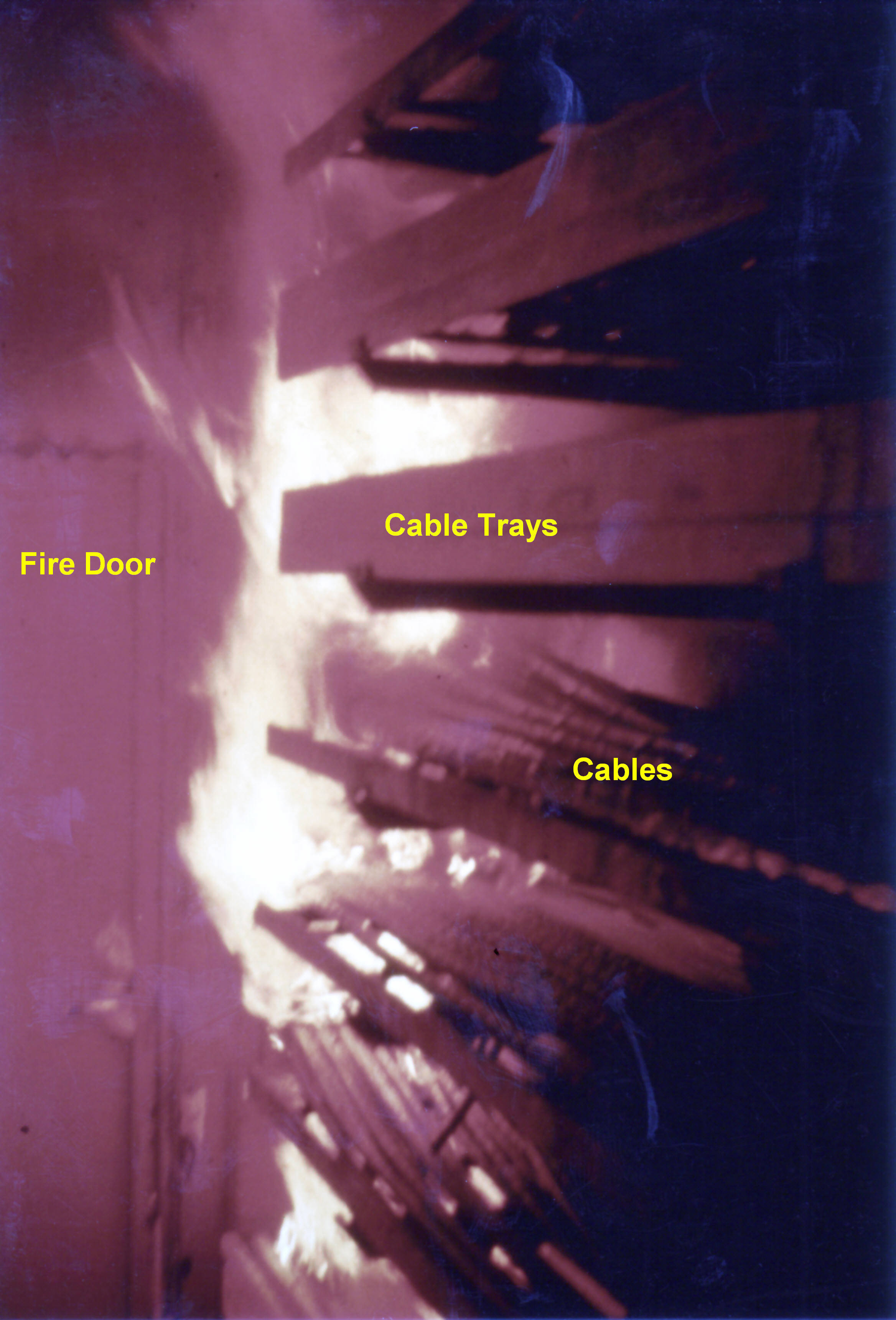
Fire test in Sweden, showing rapid fire spread through burning of cable jackets from one cable tray to another

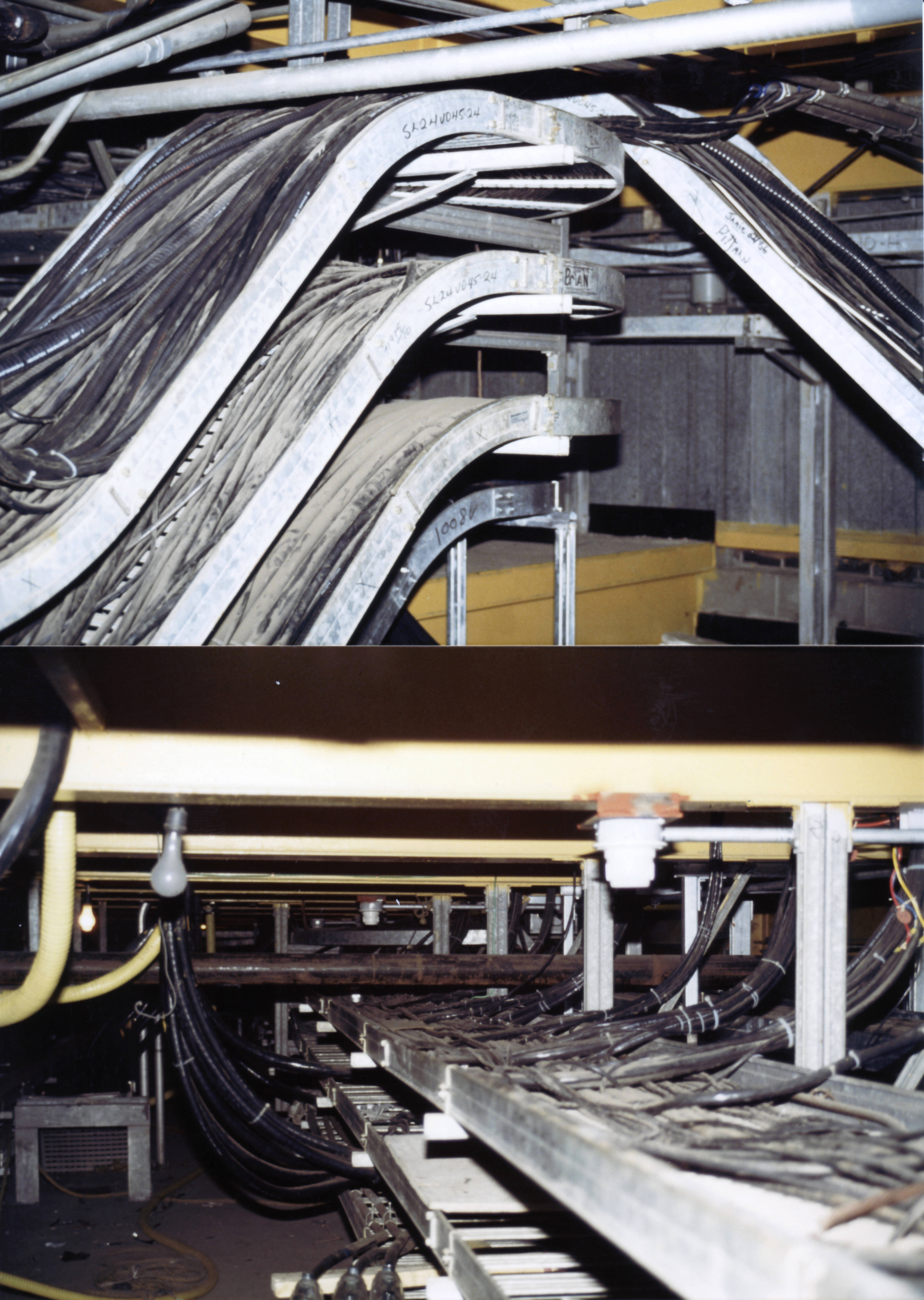
Cable spreading room at Point Tupper

In the electrical wiring of buildings, a cable tray system is used to support insulated electrical cables used for power distribution, control, and communication. Cable trays are used as an alternative to open wiring or electrical conduit systems, and are commonly used for cable management in commercial and industrial construction. They are especially useful in situations where changes to a wiring system are anticipated, since new cables can be installed by laying them in the tray, instead of pulling them through a pipe.

According to the National Electrical Code standard of the United States, a cable tray is a unit or assembly of units or sections and associated fittings forming a rigid structural system used to securely fasten or support cables and raceways.

== Types ==
Several types of tray are used in different applications. A solid-bottom tray provides the maximum protection to cables, but requires cutting the tray or using fittings to enter or exit cables. A deep, solid enclosure for cables is called a cable channel or cable trough.

A ventilated tray has openings in the bottom of the tray, allowing some air circulation around the cables, water drainage, and allowing some dust to fall through the tray. Small cables may exit the tray through the ventilation openings, which may be either slots or holes punched in the bottom. A ladder tray has the cables supported by a traverse bar, similarly to the rungs of a ladder, at regular intervals on the order of 4 to 12 inches (100 to 300 mm).

Ladder and ventilated trays may have solid covers to protect cables from falling objects, dust, and water. Tray covers for use outdoors or in dusty locations may have a peaked shape to shed debris including dust, ice or snow. Lighter cable trays are more appropriate in situations where a great number of small cables are used, such as for telephone or computer network cables. These trays may be made of wire mesh, called "cable basket", or be designed in the form of a single central spine (rail) with ribs to support the cable on either side.

Channel Tray provides an economical support for cable drops and branch cable runs from the backbone cable tray system. Channel cable tray is used for installations with limited numbers of tray cable when conduit is undesirable.

Large power cables laid in the tray may require support blocks to maintain spacing between conductors, to prevent overheating of the wires. Smaller cables may be laid unsecured in horizontal trays, or secured with cable ties to the bottom of vertically mounted trays.

To maintain support of cables at changes of elevation or direction of a tray, a large number of specialized cable tray fittings are made compatible with each style and manufacturer. Horizontal elbows change direction of a tray in the same plane as the bottom of the tray and are made in 30, 45 and 90 degree forms; inside and outside elbows are for changes perpendicular to the tray bottom. These can be in various shapes including tees and crosses. Some manufacturers and types provide adjustable elbows, useful for field-fitting a tray around obstacles or around irregular shapes.

Various clamping, supporting and splicing accessories are used with the cable tray to provide a complete functional tray system. For example, different sizes of cable tray used within one run can be connected with reducers.

== Materials used ==
Common cable trays are made of galvanized steel, stainless steel, aluminum, or glass-fiber reinforced plastic. The material for a given application is chosen based on where it will be used. Galvanized tray may be made of pre-galvanized steel sheet fabricated into tray, or may be hot-dip galvanized after fabrication. When galvanized tray is cut to length in the field, usually the cut surface will be painted with a zinc-rich compound to protect the metal from corrosion.

== Fire safety concerns and solutions ==
Combustible cable jackets may catch on fire and cable fires can thus spread along a cable tray within a structure. This is easily prevented through the use of fire-retardant cable jackets, or fireproofing coatings applied to installed cables. Heavy coatings or long fire-stops may require adjustment of the cable current ratings, since such fireproofing measures may reduce the heat dissipation of installed cables.

Regular housecleaning is important for safety, as cable trays are often installed in hard to reach places. Combustible dust and clutter may accumulate if the trays are not routinely checked and kept clean.

Plastic and fibreglass reinforced plastic cable trays are combustible; the effect is mitigated through the use of fire retardants or fireproofing.

Ferrous cable trays expand with the increasing heat from accidental fire. This has been proven by the German Otto-Graf-Institut Test Report III.1-80999/Tei/tei "Supplementary Test On The Topic Of Mechanical Force Acting On Cable Penetration Firestop Systems During The Fire Test", dated 23 October 1984, to dislodge "soft" firestops, such as those made of fibrous insulations with rubber coatings. This also applies to any silicone foam seals, but is easily remedied through the use of firestop mortars of sufficient compression strength and thickness, as shown above. Also, some building codes mandate that penetrants such as cable trays are installed in such ways so as to avoid their contribution to the collapse of a firewall.

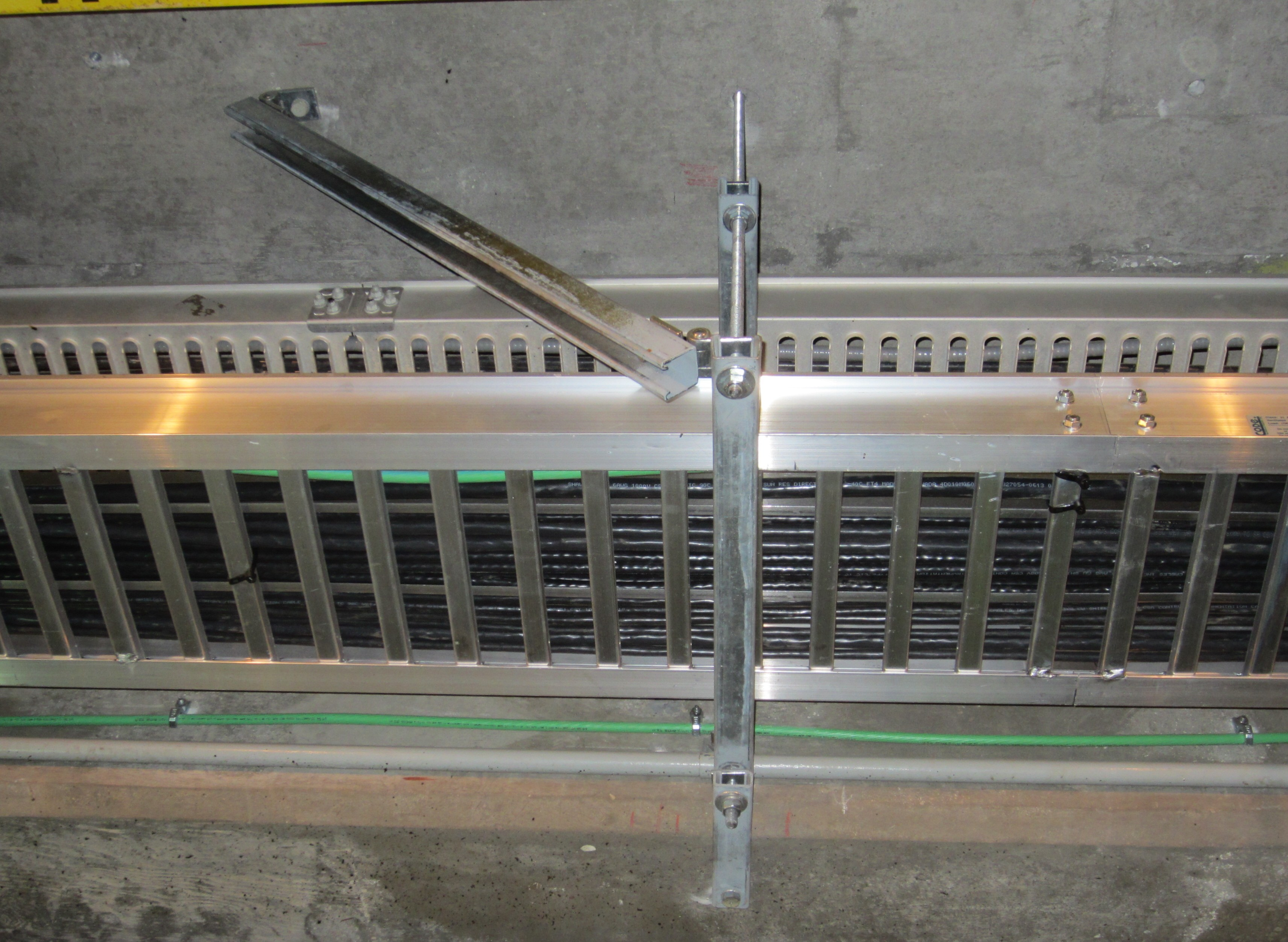
Seismic bracing of a cable tray trapeze support. The diagonal strut and horizontal tie restrains motion longitudinally and laterally.

== See also ==
- Passive fire protection
- Circuit integrity
- Intumescent
- Endothermic
- Conduit (electrical)
