= Certification listing =

Document used for installations

In product certification, a certification listing is a public record of products that have been tested and approved to meet safety or performance standards, helping installers, inspectors, and regulators ensure products are used correctly. Typically, subject-related certification listing are required when there are safety constraints associated with product installation and use. Certification listings are issued by organisations that are usually nationally accredited for doing both testing and product certification work.

Each product in the listing is supported by a certification document, which is the official certificate showing that a specific product meets the requirements of a recognized certification program, such as those following ISO/IEC 17065. Listings and documents are managed by accredited organizations to ensure products are safe, reliable, and consistently compliant.

== Description ==
A certification listing guides the installation and use of products that have been evaluated and certified for safety and performance. In many regulatory contexts, the concept is embedded in formal definitions of “listed,” “certified,” and “labeled” products. After a product is installed on-site, a listing enables verification of compliance with relevant regulations, such as building or electrical codes.

== Organizations ==
Certification listings are issued by organizations that are usually nationally accredited for doing both testing and product certification work, in accordance with nationally accredited standards.

Such organizations include Underwriters Laboratories, FM Global, or the Deutsches Institut für Bautechnik (DIBt).

== Documentation ==
After testing, the testing laboratory issues a confidential test report to the manufacturer.

If the product passes the testing required for certification, the items in the test that passed are given a certification listing, which describes the product(s) that were tested, the application, and maximum and minimum tolerances for all components. Certification listings are short versions and interpretations of the test results. A certification listing indicates that the test has been properly conducted, the tested systems passed, and that a follow-up agreement is in effect between the manufacturer or submitter and the certifier. In the event that irregularities are discovered on the part of the manufacturer - substitutions of cheaper ingredients or components, deliberate or inadvertent irregularities, or an ingredient or component of a tested system which is no longer be available has been substituted - the listing can be de-activated and the manufacturer asked to remove all logos of the certifier from product literature, promotional materials, packaging, etc.

=== Accredited testing and certification organizations ===
Canada

- Accreditation: Standards Council of Canada
- Accreditation: ANSI National Accreditation Board (ANAB)
- Accreditation: American Association for Laboratory Accreditation (A2LA)
- Accreditation: International Accreditation Service (IAS)
- Certification and Testing: Underwriters' Laboratories of Canada
- Certification and Testing: Canadian Standards Association (CSA)
- Certification and Testing: Safety Equipment Institute (SEI)
- Certification and Testing: Intertek

Germany

- Accreditation and Approvals: Deutsches Institut für Bautechnik (DIBt)

United States

- Accreditation: Standards Council of Canada
- Accreditation: ANSI National Accreditation Board (ANAB)
- Accreditation: American Association for Laboratory Accreditation (A2LA)
- Accreditation: International Accreditation Service (IAS)
- Testing and Certification: Underwriters Laboratories
- Testing and Certification: Intertek
- Testing and Certification: Safety Equipment Institute (SEI)
- Testing and Certification: Canadian Standards Association (CSA)

== See also ==
- Product certification
- Fire door
- Fire test
- Fire-resistance rating
- Passive fire protection
- Fire protection
