= Deutsches Institut für Bautechnik =

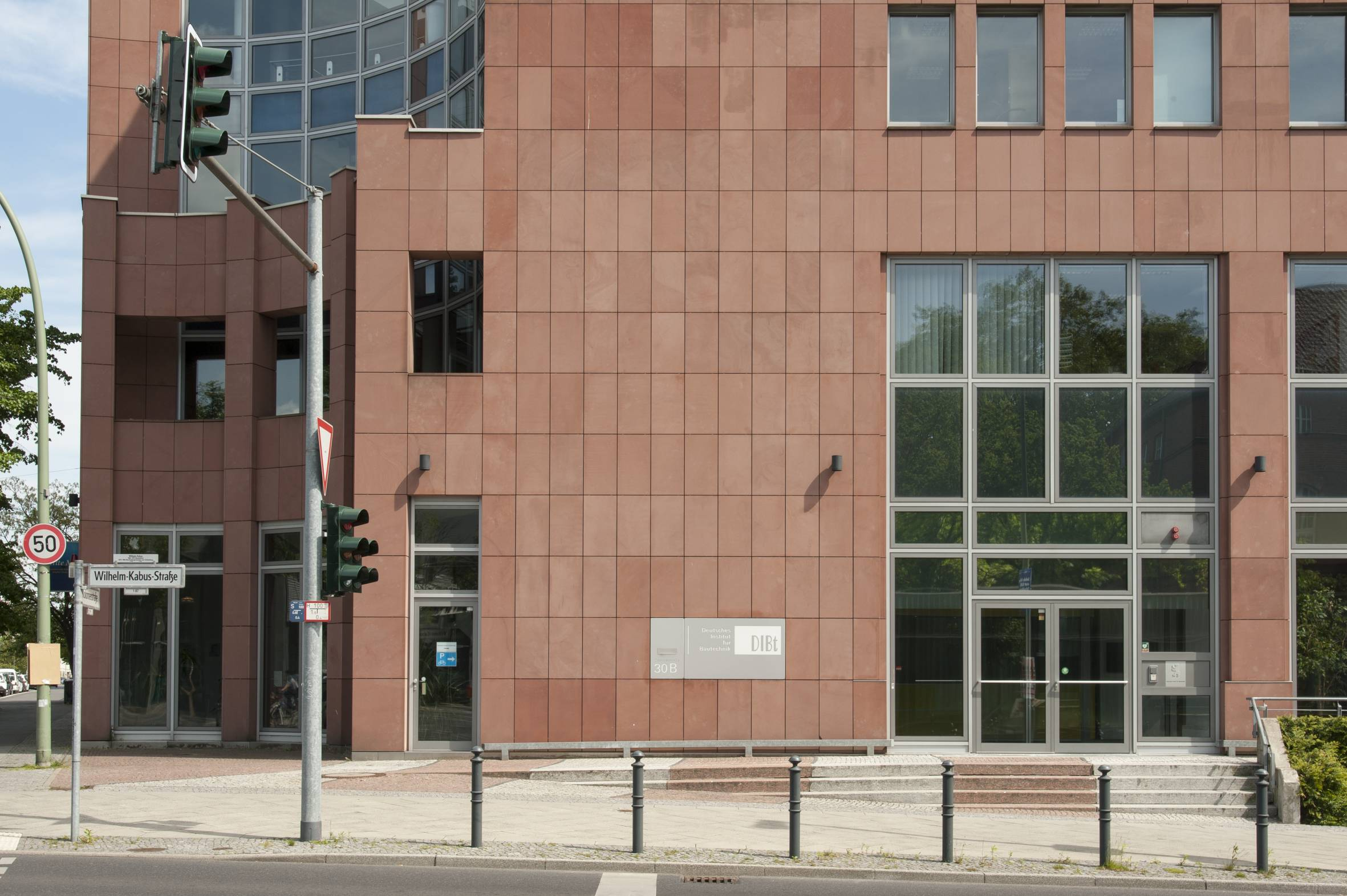
DIBt, Berlin – Entry area

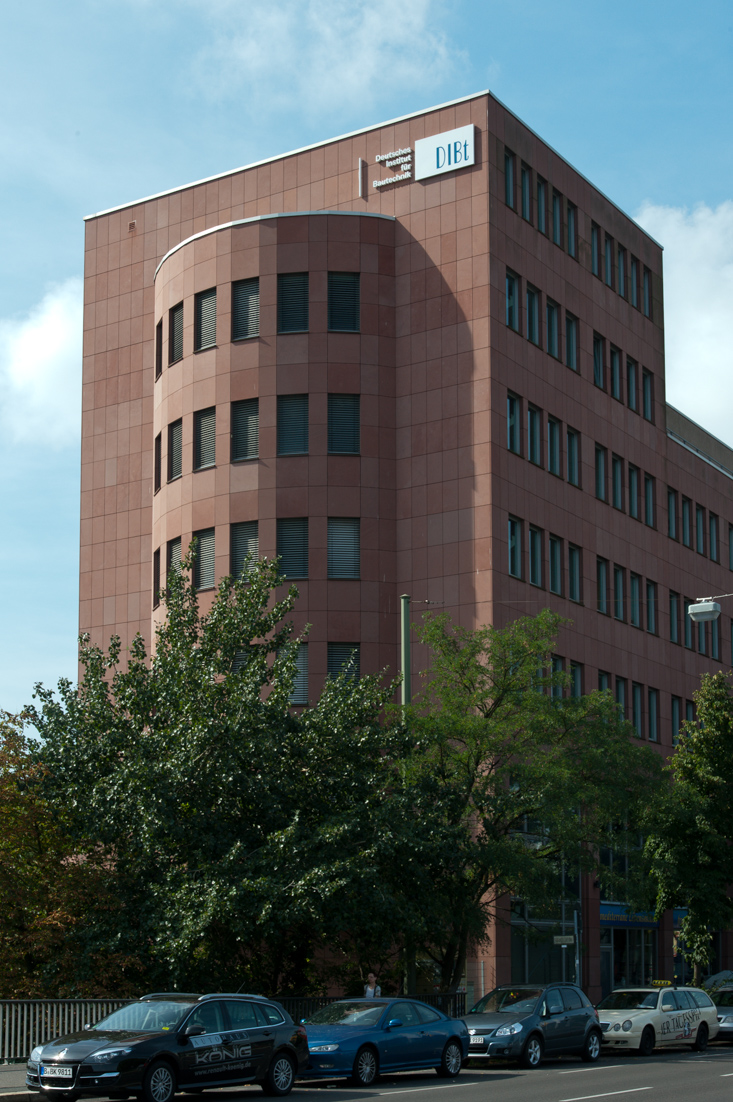
DIBt, Berlin – Exterior view

Deutsches Institut für Bautechnik (DIBt) is a technical authority in the construction sector. The Institute carries out its activities on the basis of an agreement concluded between the Federation and the German federal states (Länder). Its most important task is the approval of non-regulated construction products and construction techniques. The Institute is based in Berlin.

== Fields of activity ==
Deutsches Institut für Bautechnik's fields of activity are:

- grants national technical approvals (allgemeine bauaufsichtliche Zulassungen) for construction products and construction techniques.
- issues European Technical Assessments (ETAs) for construction products in accordance with the Construction Products Regulation (Regulation (EU) No 305/2011).
- draws up the Construction Products Lists (Bauregellisten) A and B as well as List C, and publishes them on behalf of the German federal states (Länder). The Construction Products Lists A and B contain officially recognised technical rules for construction products. List C contains construction products which are less safety-relevant and for which there are no technical building rules.
- prepares the introduction of the List of Technical Building Rules (Liste der Technischen Baubestimmungen), which contains officially recognised design rules.
- registers energy performance certificates and inspection reports for air-conditioning systems in accordance with the Energy Saving Ordinance (Energieeinsparverordnung, EnEV 2013). In addition, DIBt is responsible for the electronic random checks.
- validates stability analyses for structural designs intended for multiple use at different locations (so-called structural design approvals) in its capacity as a structural safety control authority (Bautechnisches Prüfamt).
- carries out preparatory work for the recognition of testing laboratories, inspection bodies and certification bodies, which want to become active in the external surveillance of construction products. The Institute also carries out the recognition in most of the federal states.
- notifies independent third-party bodies (so-called notified bodies), which assess and verify the constancy of performance of CE marked construction products.
- is active in the market surveillance of CE marked construction products in its capacity as the joint market surveillance authority of the federal states.
- promotes building research.
- prepares expert opinions on behalf of the Federation and the federal states.
- is actively involved in devising technical regulations (in particular standards) at a national, European and international level.

The work of Deutsches Institut für Bautechnik focuses on the protection of public interests, in particular in relation to stability, fire protection, health and environmental protection, acoustic and thermal insulation, energy efficiency, sustainability, safety in use as well as water pollution control.

== History ==
After the Second World War, construction supervision and building control law fell into the jurisdiction of the German federal states (Länder). They were confronted with two issues in relation to the approval of construction products. On the one hand, there was a substantial increase in the technical complexity of the approvals due to the numerous new products and processes developed during the time of the German economic miracle. On the other hand, the construction product industry demanded approvals which were valid across Germany. In response to this, the "Institut für Bautechnik" was founded in 1968 based on an agreement between the Federation and the federal states. The Institute became responsible for issuing technical approvals (valid across Germany) and additional engineering-related tasks.

After the German reunification, the new Länder joined the agreement in 1993. The name of the Institute was changed to "Deutsches Institut für Bautechnik" (DIBt). The Institute is known by its abbreviation "DIBt" among experts far beyond national borders.

Since its foundation, the Institute has taken on many additional tasks. Since 1993, it has been active in the European Organisation for Technical Approvals (EOTA). Since 1994, it has published the Construction Products Lists (Bauregellisten) on behalf of the Länder. In 1998, Deutsches Institut für Bautechnik granted the first European technical approval in Europe. In 2007, DIBt was recognised by the Land of Berlin and the Land of Brandenburg as Structural Safety Control Authority (Bautechnisches Prüfamt). In 2008, it took over the coordination of the market surveillance of CE marked products and since 2014, it has been the "joint market surveillance authority of the Länder". In 2012, DIBt was designated as the sole Technical Assessment Body in Germany, as well as the notifying authority in accordance with the new Construction Products Regulation. Upon publication of the revised Energy Saving Ordinance (Energieeinsparverordnung) in November 2013, DIBt also became responsible for registering energy performance certificates and inspection reports for air-conditioning systems, as well as for carrying out electronic random checks.

== Organisation ==
DIBt is a public-law institution (Anstalt des öffentlichen Rechts) with legal capacity. Since 2009, the Institute has been led by Dipl.-Ing. Gerhard Breitschaft. He is supported by the Supervisory Board, which decides on general policy matters.

The Senate Department (Senatsverwaltung) of the Land of Berlin carries out the technical and legal supervision of the Institute.

DIBt is structured in five departments:

Department I - Structural Engineering
Head: Mr Andreas Kummerow

Department II – Health and environmental protection, Registration of energy performance certificates
Head: Mr Dirk Brandenburger

Department III – Building physics, Technical building equipment
Head: Mr Prof. Gunter Hoppe

Department P – Presidential Department
Head: Mr Dr.-Ing. Karsten Kathage, Vice President of DIBt

Department ZD – Administration and Services
Head: Ms Dr. Patricia Döring

Departments I to III jointly cover all technical requirements for construction works. Approximately 150 engineers and scientists are employed here. The Presidential Department includes the Sections for National as well as European and International Law. The coordination with the Technical Assessment Bodies of other European countries and the recognition and notification of third parties is also carried out here. The Market Surveillance Section is also part of the Presidential Department. The Administration and Services Department carries out internal administration tasks and is responsible for communication with the European and international partners of DIBt.

DIBt is supported in its technical work by approximately 600 honorary experts from science, industry and administration. They are organised in product and subject-specific expert committees, as well as in interdisciplinary General Policy Committees (Ausschüsse für Grundsatzfragen).

== Legal basis ==
The tasks and structure of Deutsches Institut für Bautechnik are set out in the Agreement on Deutsches Institut für Bautechnik (DIBt Agreement). This agreement was enacted with the Act on Deutsches Institut für Bautechnik of 22 April 1993 and last revised in 2012. Details are laid down in the Statutes of Deutsches Institut für Bautechnik.

The Building Codes of the German federal states (Landesbauordnungen) are the most important legal basis for the engineering-related activities of the Institute at a national level. These are based on the Model Building Code (Musterbauordung) developed by the Conference of Construction Ministers (Bauministerkonferenz).

For certain construction products and construction techniques, the Institute also assesses the compliance with water pollution control provisions.

The activities of the Institute in the field of registering energy performance certificates and inspection reports for air-conditioning systems, as well as carrying out electronic random checks are mainly governed by the revised Energy Saving Ordinance (Energieeinsparverordnung, EnEV 2013).

The recognition of testing laboratories, inspection bodies and certification bodies is based on the Länder ordinances on the recognition as a testing laboratory, inspection and certification body in accordance with the Building Codes.

The Construction Products Regulation (Regulation (EU) No 305/2011) forms the most important legal basis for the activity of the Institute under European law. On 1 July 2013, the Construction Products Regulation replaced the Construction Products Directive (Directive 89/106/EEC) which applied previously.

The structure and procedures of market surveillance are regulated on a cross-sectoral basis in Regulation (EC) No 765/2008.

== Participation and cooperation ==
The exchange with experts is an important part of the technical work of DIBt.

Through its membership, DIBt supports, among others, the German Geotechnical Society (DGGT), the German Committee for Reinforced Concrete (DAfStb), the German Committee on Steel Construction (DASt), the German Association for Water, Wastewater and Waste (DWA) and the Public Service Employer Association of Berlin (KAV Berlin) at a national level. Furthermore, DIBt cooperates closely with the German Accreditation Body (DAkkS) and it actively participates in the standardisation activities of the German Institute for Standardization (DIN).

At European level, DIBt is active in the following bodies: the European Organisation for Technical Assessment (EOTA), the European Union of Agrément in Construction (UEAtc), the European Committee for Standardization (CEN), the Standing Committee on Construction (SCC), the Expert Group on Fire Related Issues (EGF), the Expert Group on Dangerous Substances (EGDS) and the Administrative Cooperation Group for Market Surveillance under the Construction Products Regulation (AdCo CPR).

DIBt is also a member of the World Federation of Technical Assessment Organisations (WFTAO).
