= Edinburgh Fire Research Centre =

Scottish research group

The Edinburgh Fire Research Center (formerly the BRE Centre for Fire Safety Engineering) is the research group at The Institute of Infrastructure and Environment, University of Edinburgh, conducting research in Fire Protection Engineering.

== History ==
The University of Edinburgh was the first university to offer a degree in Fire engineering. Leaders in the field came to Edinburgh to study and research under the supervision of Rasbash, a pioneer of the discipline, and Dougal Drysdale, author of a textbook on the subject. Jose Torero held the BRE/RAE Chair in Fire Safety Engineering from 2004 to 2012. Albert Simeoni held the BRE chair from 2013 to 2015. Grunde Jomaas held the BRE chair from 2016 to 2021. Teaching and research in fire safety continues at Edinburgh under the leadership of Prof Luke Bisby, professor of fire and structures.

== Staff ==
The staff of the Edinburgh Fire Research Centre comprises six academics, several research associates, about 20-25 postgraduate researchers and some undergraduate researchers.

== Teaching ==
The Centre supports the Structural and Fire Safety Engineering degrees (BEng, MEng and MSc) as well as a number of short courses for professionals.

The centre is part of the International Master of Science in Fire Safety Engineering consortium. The joint degree started in September 2010 and involves the universities of Edinburgh (UK), Ghent (Belgium) and Lund (Sweden).

== Research expertise ==
- Structural Fire Engineering
- Fire Modelling
- Ignition and burning of solid fuels
- Large-scale fire experiments
- Concrete, Steel and wood response to fire
- Tunnel fires
- Subsurface fires
- Wildfires
- Smouldering combustion

== Large-scale fire test ==
The Cardington tests were a series of large-scale fire tests conducted over several years from the early 1990s in a real steel-framed structure at the former airship hangar at Cardington, UK.

The Dalmarnock tests were a series of fire experiments conducted in July 2006 in a real 1960s concrete tower block in Dalmarnock, Glasgow, UK.

== Publications ==
The Centre publishes more than 100 conference papers and a dozen peer-reviewed journal papers per year. Some can be publicly accessed via their Digital Repository.
