= Dougal Drysdale =

Scottish fire-safety engineer

Dougal Drysdale FRSE, FIFireE, FSFPE
- Drysdale on a mountain, 2012
- Born: 30 September 1939 (age 87); Dunfermline, Scotland, United Kingdom
- Education: University of Edinburgh (BSc); University of Cambridge (PhD)
- Notable work: An Introduction to Fire Dynamics
- Awards: Man of the Year (SFPE, 1983); Arthur B. Guise Medal (SFPE, 1995); Kunio Kawagoe Medal (IAFSS, 2002); Rasbash Medal (IFE, 2005); D. Peter Lund Award (SFPE, 2009)
- Scientific career
- Fields: Fire safety engineering, Fire dynamics
- Workplaces: University of Edinburgh

David Douglas "Dougal" Drysdale is a Scottish fire‑safety engineer who is a Professor Emeritus of Fire Safety Engineering at the University of Edinburgh. He is internationally recognised for his textbook An Introduction to Fire Dynamics, regarded as a foundational reference for the discipline.

== Early life and education ==
Drysdale graduated with a first‑class Bachelor of Science degree in chemistry from the University of Edinburgh in 1962, before completing a PhD in physical chemistry at the University of Cambridge.

== Academic career ==
In 1974 Drysdale joined the University of Edinburgh as a lecturer and, together with David Rasbash and Eric Marchant, co‑founded the institution’s Department of Fire Engineering (later Fire Safety Engineering). He was promoted to professor in 1990 and continued to supervise postgraduate researchers as an emeritus professor.

Drysdale served as editor‑in‑chief of the peer‑reviewed journal Fire Safety Journal from 1986 until 2011 and remains on its editorial advisory board. He is also a section editor of the SFPE Handbook of Fire Protection Engineering.

== Research ==
Over a career spanning five decades, Drysdale has authored more than 100 journal papers on topics such as: ignition of combustible materials and early fire growth; smoke production and flame spread dynamics; non‑linear phenomena in enclosure fires; computational fluid‑dynamics (CFD) modelling of flame spread and suppression; structural response of steel frames under fire exposure.

== Public inquiries and consultancy ==
Drysdale has frequently been appointed as an expert to major fire and explosion investigations, including:

the King's Cross fire (London, 1987);

the Piper Alpha oil‑rig disaster (North Sea, 1988);

the Garley Building fire (Hong Kong, 1996);

the Buncefield oil‑terminal explosion (Hemel Hempstead, 2005), where he served on the Major Incident Investigation Board.

== Professional leadership ==
Drysdale was vice‑chair (1994–2002) and chair (2002–2005) of the International Association for Fire Safety Science (IAFSS). In 2017 the Association created the biennial Dougal Drysdale Award in his honour.

== Honours and awards ==
Man of the Year, SFPE (1983)

Arthur B. Guise Medal (SFPE, 1995)

Kunio Kawagoe Gold Medal, IAFSS (2002)

Rasbash Medal, Institution of Fire Engineers (2005)

D. Peter Lund Award, SFPE (2009)

SFPE European Fire Safety Engineering Lifetime Achievement Award 2025

Scottish Engineering Hall of Fame, inducted at the annual IESIS James Watt Dinner 2 October 2026

He is a Fellow of the Royal Society of Edinburgh, the Institution of Fire Engineers, and the Society of Fire Protection Engineers.

== Selected bibliography ==
Drysdale, Dougal (2011). An Introduction to Fire Dynamics (3rd ed.). Chichester: Wiley. ISBN 978-0-470-31903-1.
