= Arthur B. Guise Medal =

The Arthur B. Guise Medal was established in 1983 and has been awarded annually starting in 1985 by the Society of Fire Protection Engineers. Named in memory of Arthur Guise, an engineer who developed dry chemicals as fire extinguishing agents, it recognizes eminent achievement in the advancement of the science and technology of fire protection engineering.

== Recipients ==
Source: SFPE

- 1985 Gunnar Heskestad
- 1986 Howard Emmons
- 1987 Oliver W. Johnson
- 1989 Tibor Z. Harmathy
- 1990 Walter M. Haessler
- 1990 Edwin J. "Jake" Jablonski
- 1991 Phillip H. Thomas
- 1992 George T. Tamura
- 1993 James F. O'Regan
- 1994 Margret Law
- 1995 Dougal Drysdale
- 1997 Cheng Yao
- 1998 John L. Bryan
- 1999 Howard R. Baum
- 2000 Craig L. Beyler
- 2001 R. Brady Williamson
- 2002 David A. Lucht
- 2003 Hsiang-Cheng Kung
- 2004 Vytenis Babrauskas
- 2005 Phillip J. DiNenno
- 2006 James G. Quintiere
- 2007 William D. Walton
- 2008 Jose L. Torero
- 2009 Archibald Tewarson
- 2010 Guylène Proulx
- 2011 Charles Fleischmann
- 2012 Richard W. Bukowski
- 2013 David A. Charters
- 2014 Ai Sekizawa
- 2015 Takeyoshi Tanaka
- 2016 James A. Milke
- 2017 Arvind Atreya
- 2018 Guillermo Rein
- 2019 Paul E. Rivers
- 2020 Erica Kuligowski
- 2021 Pravinray D. Gandhi
- 2022 Albert Simeoni
- 2023 Bart Merci
- 2024 Margaret McNamee
- 2025 Glenn Forney
- 2026 Beth Weckman

== See also ==
- List of general science and technology awards
- List of civil awards and decorations § Fire service awards and honors
- List of occupational health and safety awards
- List of awards named after people
