= Erica Kuligowski =

American social research scientist

Erica D. Kuligowski
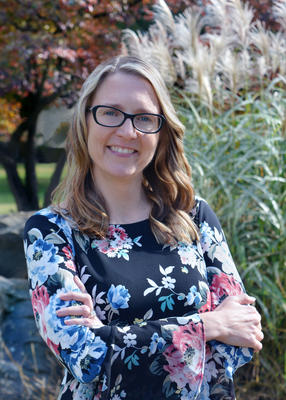
- Born: Baltimore, Maryland
- Occupation: Associate Professor at RMIT University
- Known for: Evacuation Modeling, Fire Protection Engineering
- Title: Social Research Scientist
- Awards: Harry C. Bigglestone Award, US DOC Gold Medal

Academic background
- Education: University of Maryland at College Park, University of Colorado Boulder
- Thesis: Terror Defeated: Occupant Sensemaking, Decision-Making and Protective Action in the 2001 World Trade Center Disaster Public Deposited (2011)

Academic work
- Discipline: Sociology, Fire Protection Engineering
- Main interests: Evacuation behavior, Community resilience, Disaster studies, Evacuation modeling

Erica Kuligowski is an American social research scientist investigating human behavior during emergencies and the performance of evacuation models in disasters. She currently works at RMIT university in Melbourne (Australia). Kuligowski previously worked in the Engineering Lab of the National Institute of Standards and Technology.

== Early life and education ==
Erica Kuligowski grew up in Baltimore and Forest Hill, Maryland. She attended high school near a fire station and thought about becoming a firefighter. While attending a program at University of Maryland College Park for women in STEM, Kuligowski watched a demonstration on fire modeling which inspired her to pursue fire protection engineering. Kuligowski earned her B.S. in 2001 and M.S. in 2003 in Fire Protection Engineering from University of Maryland at College Park. She then went on to earn her PhD in sociology from University of Colorado Boulder in 2011. Her dissertation focused on the behavior of occupants and factors in decision-making processes during the 2001 attack on the World Trade Center.

== Career and research ==
Kuligowski currently works at RMIT university in Melbourne (Australia) since 2020. Her work focuses on human behavior in response to emergency situations. Her work also includes research into infrastructure failure during the hurricane, and what could be improved to increase resiliency in similar emergencies. Before moving to RMIT, she conducted research for the Wildland-Urban Interface (WUI) Fire Group, and she was the Team Lead for the NIST Hurricane Maria Project. For WUI, Kuligowski is working on a project to assess emergency communications during the Chimney Tops 2 Fire of November, 2016. Previously, Kuligowski worked on three different NIST research teams including two years with the Community Resilience Group. Her work involved educating communities on how to build resiliency through the assessment of structures in terms of their social or economic importance. Kuligowski has also done research on fire emergency drills and responses, particularly regarding egress models. Her work also includes studies on the World Trade Center attack on September 11. Her dissertation titled "Terror Defeated: Occupant Sensemaking, Decision-Making, and Protective Action in the 2001 World Trade Center Disaster" addresses pre-evacuation behavior and assessment during the largest building evacuation in history.

=== Awards and honors ===
In 2014, Erica Kuligowski was awarded the Harry C. Bigglestone Award for a paper entitled "Predicting Human Behavior During Fires," which discusses evacuation models and potential for improvement through analysis of occupant decision making. She won the award again in 2017 along with the group of researchers who published "Assessing the Verification and Validation of Building Fire Evacuation Models," which outlines possible verification and validation tests as a means of determining the efficacy of evacuation models. From her work at NIST, she earned two US DOC Gold Medals for her research on evacuation during the 2001 World Trade Center disaster and emergency communication during the 2011 tornado in Joplin, Missouri.

In 2020 she was awarded the Arthur B. Guise Medal of the Society of Fire Protection Engineers.

=== Publications ===
- Hurley, M. J., Gottuk, D. T., Hall, J. R. Jr., Harada, K., Kuligowski, E. D., Puchovsky, M., Torero, J. L., Watts, J. M. Jr., & Wieczorek, C. J. (eds.). SFPE Handbook of Fire Protection Engineering (5th ed.). Cham: Springer, 2016. ISBN 978-1-4939-2565-0.
- Lovreglio, R., Kuligowski, E. D., Gwynne, S., & Boyce, K. (2019). A pre-evacuation database for use in egress simulations. Fire Safety Journal, 105, 107–128. https://doi.org/10.1016/j.firesaf.2018.12.009.
- Ronchi, E., Kuligowski, E. D., Nilsson, D., Peacock, R. D., & Reneke, P. A. (2016). Assessing the verification and validation of building fire evacuation models. Fire Technology, 52(1), 197–219. https://doi.org/10.1007/s10694-014-0432-3
- Kuligowski, E. D. (2013). Predicting human behavior during fires. Fire Technology, 49(1), 101–120. https://doi.org/10.1007/s10694-011-0245-6
- Tierney, K., Bevc, C., & Kuligowski, E. (2006). Metaphors matter: Disaster myths, media frames, and their consequences in Hurricane Katrina. The Annals of the American Academy of Political and Social Science, 604(1), 57–81. https://doi.org/10.1177/0002716205285589
- Averill, J. D., Mileti, D. S., Peacock, R. D., Kuligowski, E. D., Groner, N., Proulx, G., Reneke, P. A., & Nelson, H. E. (2005). Occupant Behavior, Egress, and Emergency Communication. Federal Building and Fire Safety Investigation of the World Trade Center Disaster (NIST NCSTAR 1-7). Gaithersburg, MD: National Institute of Standards and Technology.
- Kuligowski, E. D., & Peacock, R. D. (2005). A Review of Building Evacuation Models (NIST Technical Note 1471). Gaithersburg, MD: National Institute of Standards and Technology.
