= Margaret Law =

British engineer (1928–2017)

- Born: 1928
- Died: August 27, 2017

Margaret Law (1928 – 27 August 2017) was a British engineer and pioneer in the field of fire science and fire safety engineering who became one of the world's leading fire scientists. In 1971, she was the first woman to become a member of the Institution of Fire Engineers, and has been described as representing 'the epitome of placing applied and rigorous technical excellence at the heart of the design and construction of the built environment'.

== Personal life and education ==
Margaret Law was born in London. She studied at the University of London and graduated with a BSc in physics and mathematics. Law married her spouse, James Peter Morris, in 1974. She died on 27 August 2017, at her home in London, aged 88.

== Career and research ==
She joined the UK government's Fire Research Station (which later became part of the Building Research Establishment) in 1952, and during her 20 years there she contributed to a wide range of research reports, on topics that extended from domestic issues of cooker fires in caravans and prefabs, to the much larger concerns of the potential for nuclear radiation to start fires. Her research interests included how fires start and spread through high-rise buildings, heat radiation from fires and requirements for building separation for fire protection. She later worked for a few years in the Directorate of Research Requirements at the Department of the Environment in the UK, assessing priorities for research in the field of building and construction.

Margaret Law joined Ove Arup & Partners in 1974 to act as a fire engineering adviser for projects the company was involved in at the time. Together with Turlogh O’Brien CBE, she became one of the founders of Arup's Fire Engineering specialist consultancy. She was especially renowned for her work on structural steelwork in fire, with codified methods that are still used in the UK, Europe and United States. Law retired at the end of 1990 and took on a role as consultant to the Ove Arup Partnership. A book of her papers was produced to honour her achievements when she left this role in 2002, and a second edition was published after her death in 2017.

Law's research led to changes in modern building regulations, codes of practice, and design guides. She was involved in national and international committees on fire safety, and was a visiting researcher at the Science University of Tokyo in 1987 and was made visiting professor at the University of Greenwich in 1997. In the UK, she played a prominent role in steps to enable fire engineers to achieve chartered status through the Institution of Fire Engineers.

== Notable projects ==
During her professional life, Margaret Law prepared fire safety solutions for numerous notable projects:

- Pompidou Centre in Paris (1977)
- Lord's Cricket Ground (1987)
- Lloyd's Building (1978)
- Stansted Airport Terminal (1986)
- Kansai International Airport (1994) in Japan.

She was also involved in the inquiry of the 1985 fire at Bradford City Stadium. This resulted to news safety standards for sports stadiums in the UK, particularly the prohibition of wooden grandstands.

== Awards and commemoration ==
Margaret Law received several national and international awards, including MBE in 1993 for services to fire safety, and the Arthur B Guise Medal from the Society of Fire Protection Engineers (SFPE) in 1994. In 2018 the SFPE board of directors established the Margaret Law Award to recognise individuals who have pioneered advances associated with the engineering fire safety of the built environment.
