= Michael Spearpoint =

British–New Zealand fire engineer

- Citizenship: United Kingdom; New Zealand
- Education: University of Nottingham (BSc); University of Maryland (MSc); University of Canterbury (PhD)
- Known for: Fire-load design fires; vehicle-fire research; performance-based design guidance
- Awards: Fellow of the Society of Fire Protection Engineers (2024)
- Scientific career
- Fields: Fire engineering, fire safety science
- Workplaces: OFR Consultants; University of Canterbury
- Thesis: Integration of Building Product Models with Fire Simulation Software (2005)

Michael Spearpoint is a British-New Zealand fire engineer and researcher who serves as Research Leader at OFR Consultants in Manchester, United Kingdom. He previously spent nearly two decades at the University of Canterbury in New Zealand, where he became Associate Professor and directed its postgraduate fire-engineering programme.

== Education ==
Spearpoint earned a BSc (Hons) in Physics from the University of Nottingham in 1987. He completed an MSc in Fire Protection Engineering at the University of Maryland in 1999, and received his PhD in Fire Engineering from the University of Canterbury in 2005 for a thesis entitled Integration of Building Product Models with Fire Simulation Software.

== Career ==
After an early post at the UK Fire Research Station (part of BRE), Spearpoint joined the University of Canterbury in 1999, rising to Associate Professor and directing its Master of Engineering in Fire Engineering. He retains an Adjunct Associate Professorship at Canterbury.

In 2017 he became Research Leader at OFR Consultants, leading projects on façade fire behaviour, cross-laminated timber, car-park design fires and the Grenfell Tower research programme. Spearpoint has authored more than 250 publications on ignition of solids, smoke-control modelling and risk-based fire design. He co-edited the third edition of the Fire Engineering Design Guide, a handbook for performance-based fire design in New Zealand. Recent work includes estimating apartment door-open times for smoke-vent studies and probabilistic fire-spread models for car parks.

== Honours ==
- Elected Fellow of the Society of Fire Protection Engineers (FSFPE), 2024.
- Chartered Engineer (CEng) and Member of the Institution of Fire Engineers.

== Selected works ==
- Spearpoint, M.J. (ed.). Fire Engineering Design Guide, 3rd ed., Centre for Advanced Engineering, University of Canterbury (2008).
- Spearpoint, M.J.; Tohir, M.Z.M. “Fire-load energy densities for risk-based design of car-parking buildings.” Case Studies in Fire Safety 3 (2015): 44–50.
- Wang, X.; Fleischmann, C.; Spearpoint, M. “Assessing the influence of fuel geometrical shape on FDS predictions for a large-scale tunnel fire.” Case Studies in Fire Safety 5 (2016): 34–41.
