= Enrico Ronchi =

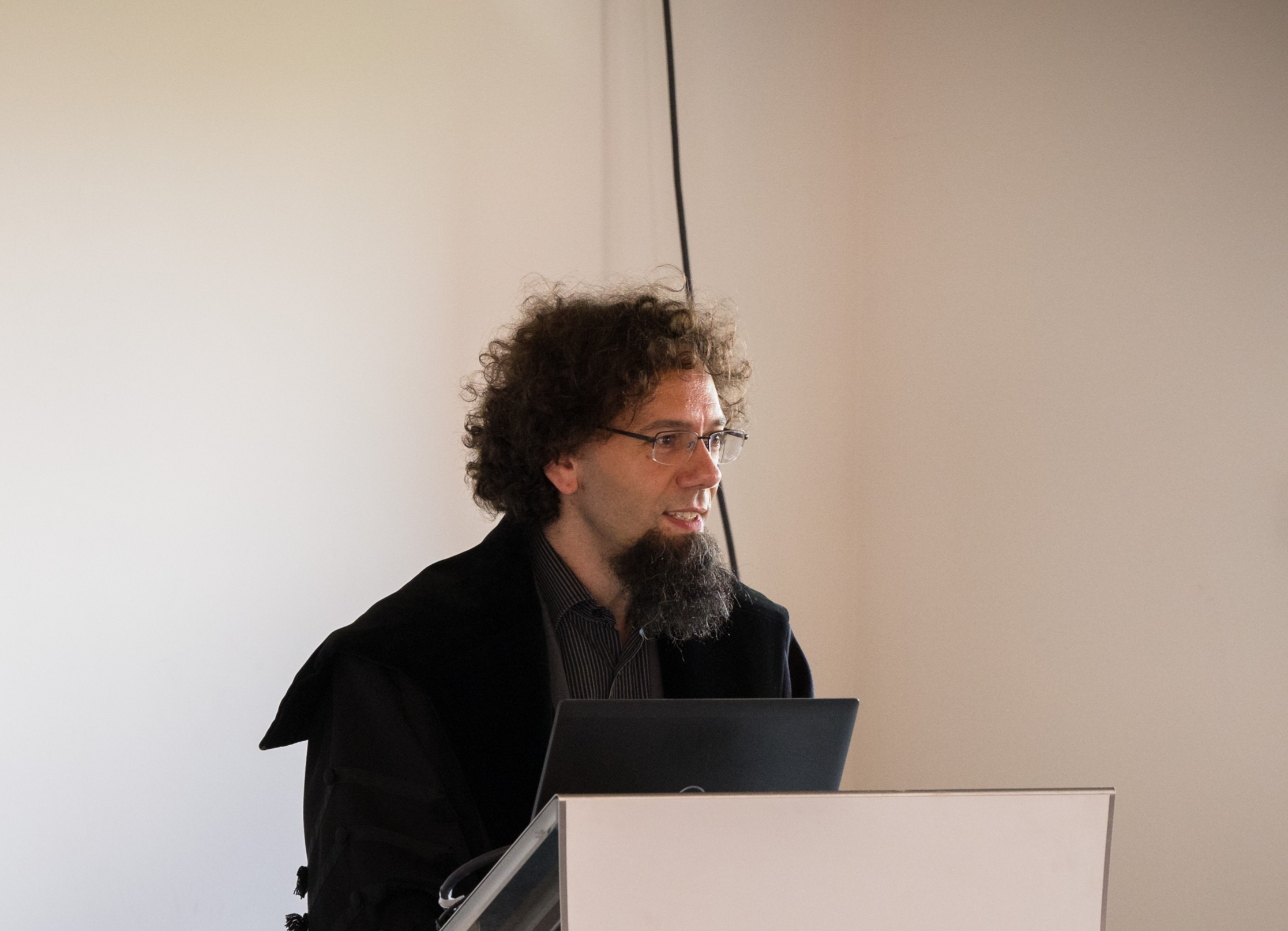
- Enrico Ronchi photo
- Born: 1984 (age 41–42); Italy
- Education: Polytechnic University of Bari
- Awards: Magnusson Early Career Award
- Scientific career
- Fields: Evacuation, Human Behaviour in Fire
- Workplaces: Lund University
- Thesis: Evacuation modelling in road tunnel fires (2012)

Enrico Ronchi (born 1984) is an Italian Associate Professor at the Department of Fire Safety Engineering at Lund University, Sweden. He is known for his research in evacuation modeling, human behavior in fire, and fire safety engineering.

== Early life and education ==
Ronchi earned his Ph.D. in Transportation Engineering, Land Use, and Technological Innovation from the Polytechnic University of Bari, Italy, in 2012. His doctoral research focused on human behavior in emergencies and evacuation modeling in road tunnels.

== Academic career ==
After completing his Ph.D., Ronchi held positions at several prestigious institutions. He has been a Guest Researcher at the Department of Psychology I at the University of Würzburg, Germany, and at the Fire Research Division of the National Institute of Standards and Technology (NIST) in the USA.

In 2013, Ronchi joined Lund University, where he became an associate professor in 2019. His research encompasses evacuation modeling for buildings and transportation systems, human behavior in fire scenarios, and the application of virtual reality in fire safety.

== Research and contributions ==
Ronchi has published over 180 works, including more than 100 peer-reviewed journal articles. His research has significantly contributed to understanding human behavior during fire emergencies and improving evacuation strategies in complex infrastructures. In 2024, Ronchi was awarded with an ERC Consolidator Grant to investigate Egressibility.

He is also the Associate Editor for prominent journals such as Safety Science and Fire Technology and serves on the editorial board of the Fire Safety Journal.

== Awards ==
Ronchi has received multiple awards for his research and impact on fire safety engineering. Among them, there are:

- 2019 Magnusson Mid-Career Award by the International Association for Fire Safety Science;
- 2018 and 2025 Foundation Medal by the National Fire Protection Association (USA);
- 2017 Bigglestone Award by the National Fire Protection Association (USA).
