= List of occupational health and safety awards =

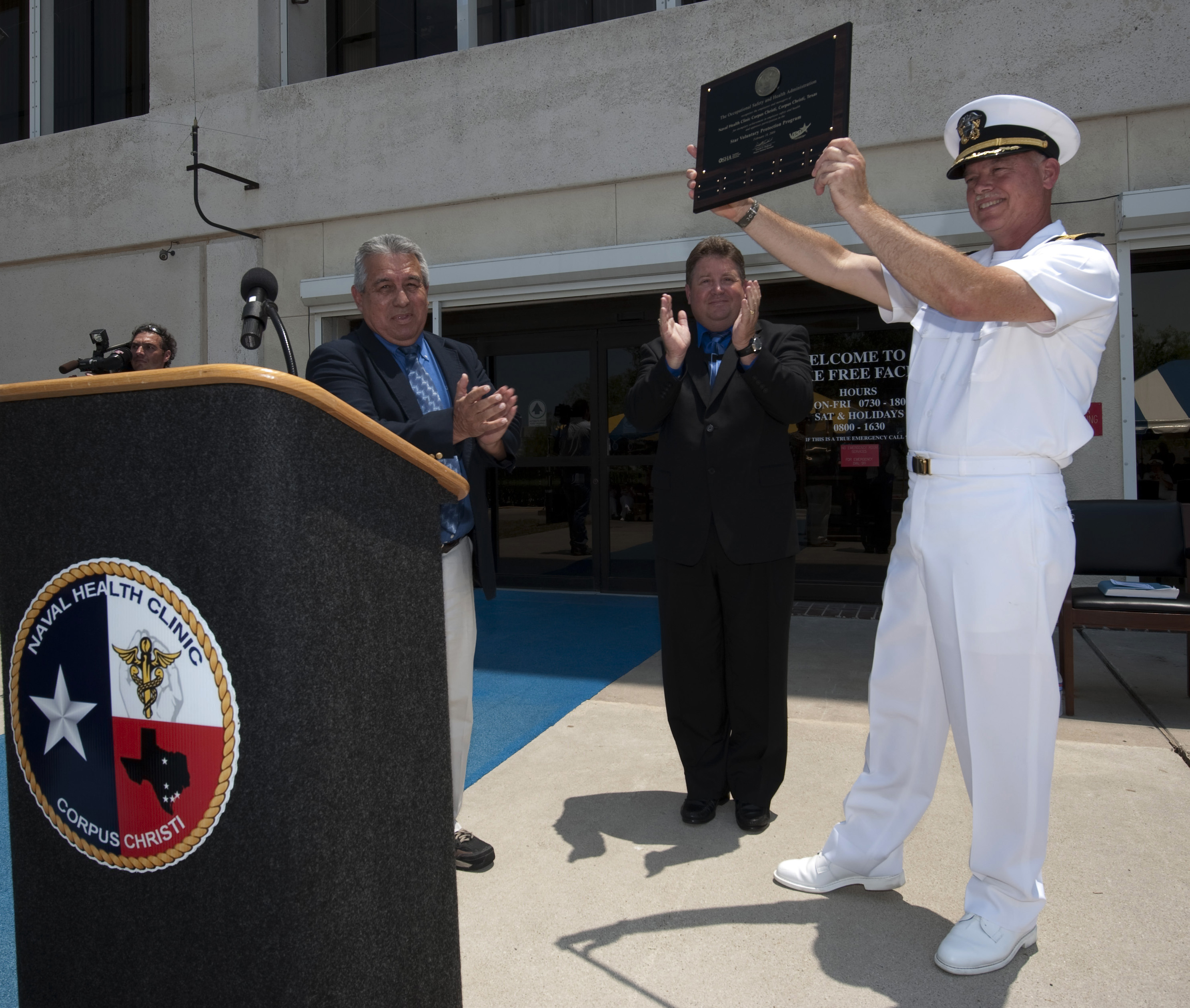
Capt. R. G. Kelley lifts the Occupational Safety and Health Administration Voluntary Protection Program Star Award (2009)

This list of occupational health and safety awards is an index to articles about notable awards for occupational health and safety. The list is organized by country since awards are almost always restricted to organizations in the same country as the sponsor of the award.

== Awards by country ==
Country	Award	Sponsor	Description
Australia	Hunter Safety Awards	National Safety Council of Australia	Organisations and people that actively promote Work Health and Safety
Australia	National Safe Work Australia Awards	Safe Work Australia	Safety and Management Achievement Program
Australia	WorkCover New South Wales SafeWork Awards	New South Wales	High standards of occupational health and safety in workplaces around New South Wales
Australia	Workplace Excellence Awards	Business Victoria (Government of Victoria)	Victorian workplaces that are pursuing cooperative approaches to industrial relations as part of their goal of better organisational performance
Australia	Worksafe Victoria Awards	WorkSafe Victoria	Businesses and individuals whose ideas, initiative and innovation help Victorian workers get home safely each night
Canada	John T. Ryan Trophy	Mine Safety Appliances, Canadian Institute of Mining, Metallurgy and Petroleum	Mine in a given category which experiences the lowest accident frequency during the previous year in all of Canada
Canada	OHS Canada Honours	OHS Magazine	Recognizes the achievements of Canadian OHS professionals in numerous categories
Germany	Blue Angel (certification)	Jury Umweltzeichen	Der Blaue Engel (The Blue Angel) Products and services that have environmentally friendly aspects
New Zealand	Workplace Health and Safety Awards	Thomson Reuters New Zealand	All aspects of workplace health, safety and wellbeing
Singapore	Workplace Safety and Health Awards	Workplace Safety and Health Council	Best in workplace safety and health

== United Kingdom / Ireland ==
Award	Sponsor	Description
RoSPA Awards	Royal Society for the Prevention of Accidents	Health and safety achievement
Health and Safety Awards	Building magazine	
International Safety Awards Scheme	British Safety Council	Demonstrated commitment to occupational health, safety and wellbeing

== United States ==
Award	Sponsor	Description
Arthur B. Guise Medal	Society of Fire Protection Engineers	Eminent achievement in the advancement of the science and technology of fire protection engineering
California Governor’s Employee Safety Awards	State of California	Individuals and groups who have provided outstanding health and safety to the state
Edward J. Baier Technical Achievement Award	American Industrial Hygiene Association	Significant contribution to industrial hygiene
Harry C. Bigglestone Award	Fire Technology magazine	Paper appearing in Fire Technology that best represents excellence in the communication of fire protection concepts
Montana Governor’s Safety & Health Awards Program	State of Montana	Commitment to excellence in workplace safety and health
New Jersey Governor’s Occupational Safety and Health Awards Program	New Jersey Department of Labor and Workforce Development	Achievement in the prevention of workplace injury and illness
Occupational Excellence Achievement Award	National Safety Council	Organizations with injury and illness records better than or equal to 50% of the Bureau of Labor Statistics for their NAICS code
OSHA Voluntary Protection Programs	Occupational Safety and Health Administration	Employers and workers in the private industry and federal agencies who have implemented effective safety and health management systems and maintain injury and illness rates below national Bureau of Labor Statistics averages for their respective industries
Pennsylvania Governor’s Award for Safety Excellence	Pennsylvania Department of Labor and Industry	Comprehensive safety practices in the workplace; successful employer-employee joint safety programs, which result in the achievement of safety excellence
Psychologically Healthy Workplace Awards	American Psychological Association	Workplace practices in employee involvement, health and safety, employee growth and development, work-life balance, employee recognition and communication
Robert W. Campbell Award	National Safety Council	Companies that achieve business excellence through the integration of EHS (Environment, Health and Safety) management into business operations
Safe-In-Sound award	National Institute for Occupational Safety and Health, National Hearing Conservation Association	Excellence in Hearing Loss Prevention
Workplace Safety Awards	National Safety Council	Various categories

== India/Gulf Region ==
Award	Sponsor	Description
Global EHS Awards	Environment Health and Safety Association	Central Government of India Registered Body EHS Award

== See also ==
- Lists of awards
- List of business and industry awards
- NIOSH
- OSHA
- Occupational safety and health
