= Luke Bisby =

Canadian-British structural fire engineer

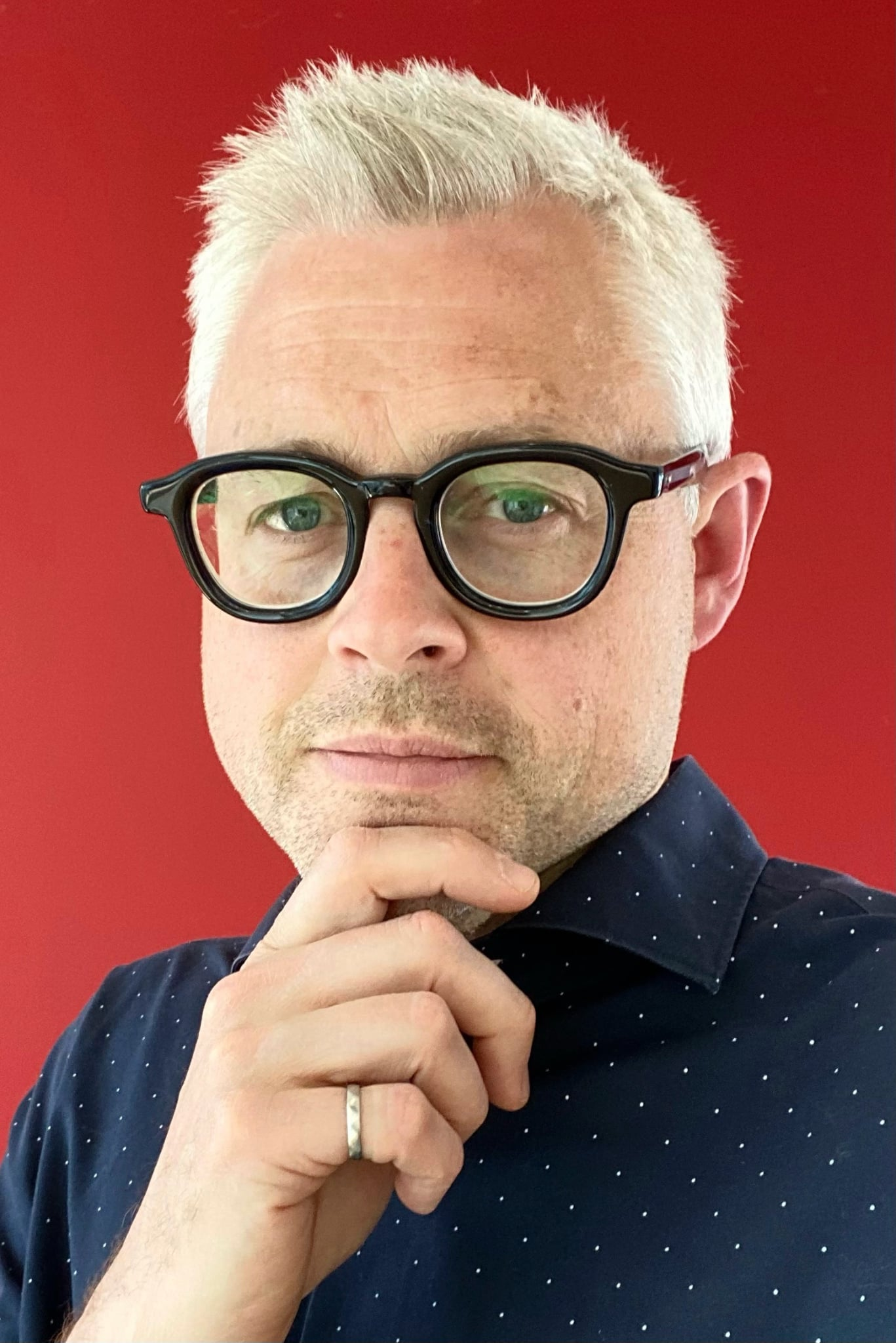
- Born: Canada
- Citizenship: Canada; United Kingdom
- Education: McGill University (BEng); Queen’s University (MSc, PhD)
- Known for: Behaviour of structures and materials in fire; Expert witness to the Grenfell Tower Inquiry; Co-Editor-in-Chief of Fire Safety Journal
- Awards: Fellow of the Royal Academy of Engineering (2021); Fellow of the Royal Society of Edinburgh (2019); Howard Medal, Institution of Civil Engineers (2016)
- Scientific career
- Fields: Structural fire engineering, civil engineering
- Workplaces: University of Edinburgh, Queen's University at Kingston, Université Laval
- Thesis: Fire Behaviour of Fibre Reinforced Polymer (FRP) Reinforced or Confined Concrete (2003)

Luke Alexander Bisby is a Canadian-born structural engineer whose research focuses on how buildings and infrastructure behave in fire. He is Chair of Fire and Structures in the School of Engineering at the University of Edinburgh and serves as Co-Editor-in-Chief of Elsevier’s Fire Safety Journal.

== Education ==
Bisby graduated with a BEng in Civil Engineering & Applied Mechanics from McGill University in 1997, followed by an MSc (Eng) in Structural Engineering (1999) and a PhD in Structural Engineering (2003) from Queen’s University in Canada. His doctoral thesis, Fire Behaviour of Fibre Reinforced Polymer (FRP) Reinforced or Confined Concrete, was the first to examine the fire performance of FRP-confined concrete columns.

== Career ==
After completing his doctorate, he joined Queen’s University as an assistant professor (2003–2008) before moving to the University of Edinburgh, first as Reader and Royal Academy of Engineering Senior Research Fellow (2008–2013) and, from 2013, as Professor and Arup Chair of Fire and Structures. He later headed the Research Institute for Infrastructure & Environment and served as Director of Discipline for Civil & Environmental Engineering (2022-2024). He has held visiting posts at the University of Science and Technology of China (2021–2023) and at Université Laval (2017–2020).

Bisby’s research spans the structural and thermal performance of concrete, timber and polymer-based composites at elevated temperatures, explosive spalling in concrete, and façade fire dynamics. He is frequently consulted by industry and regulators and was instructed as an expert witness for Phases 1 and 2 of the UK Government’s Grenfell Tower Public Inquiry.

Since 2016 he has shared editorial leadership of Fire Safety Journal, the flagship journal of the International Association for Fire Safety Science.

== Honours and awards ==
Bisby received several awards:

- Elected Fellow of the Royal Academy of Engineering, 2021
- Elected Fellow of the Royal Society of Edinburgh (FRSE), 2019
- Jack Bono Award for Engineering Communication, Society of Fire Protection Engineers, 2020

== Selected works ==
- Bisby L.A., “Structural Mechanics”, in SFPE Handbook of Fire Protection Engineering, 5th ed. (2016).
- Bartlett A.I., Hadden R.M., Hidalgo J.P., Wiesner F., Bisby L.A. “Auto-extinction of engineered timber: application to compartment fires with exposed timber surfaces,” Fire Safety Journal 91 (2017).
- Maluk C., Bisby L.A., Krajcovic M., Torero J.L. “A heat-transfer-rate inducing system (H-TRIS) test method,” Fire Safety Journal 105 (2019): 307-319.
- Rush D., Bisby L.A., Jowsey A., Lane B. “Residual capacity of fire-exposed concrete-filled steel hollow-section columns,” Engineering Structures 100 (2015): 550-563.
