= Samuel L. Manzello =

American mechanical engineer

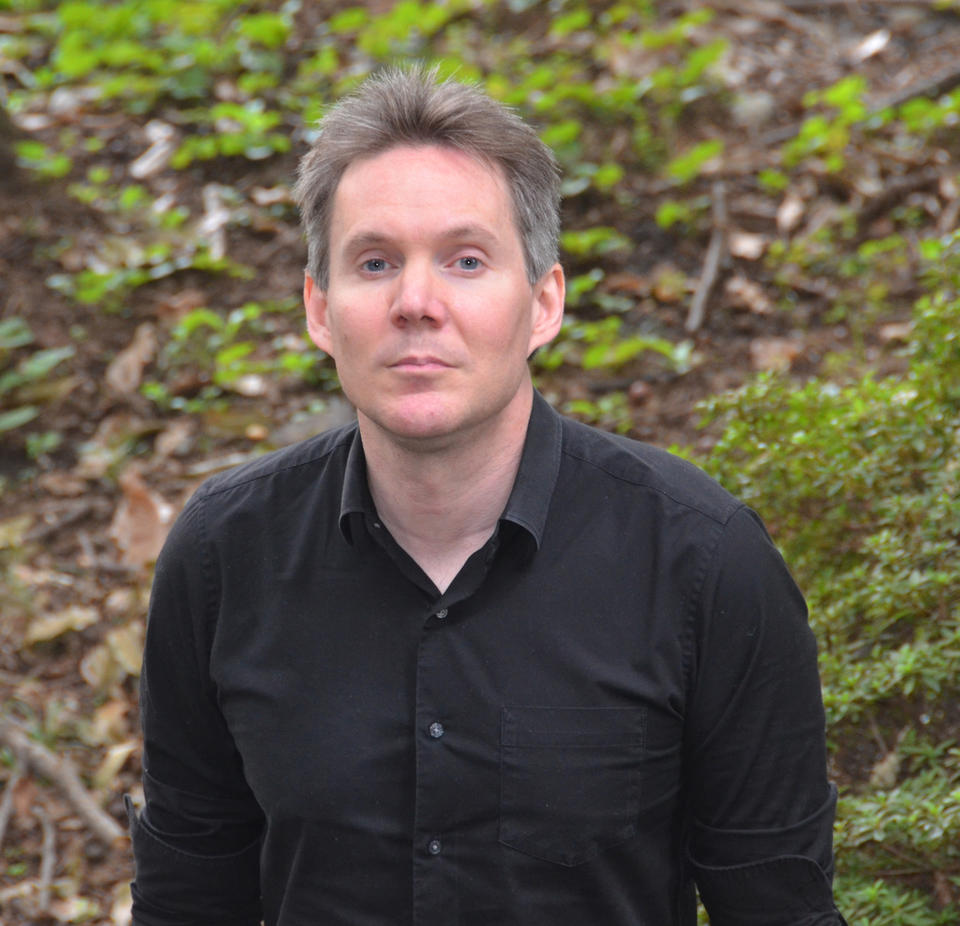
- Manzello in 2017
- Education: University of Illinois at Chicago
- Known for: Firebrand generator, the Dragon
- Scientific career
- Fields: Droplet combustion, Droplet-surface interaction, Wildland-urban interface fires
- Workplaces: Reax Engineering, Inc.
- Thesis: Microgravity droplet combustion: An experimental investigation on the influence of sooting and radiation on droplet burning (2000)
- Doctoral advisor: Mun Y. Choi

Samuel L. Manzello is a technical advisor at Reax Engineering, Inc. and a visiting professor Tohoku University (Japan).

== Life and career ==
Manzello holds B.S. with honors (1996) and PhD (2000) in mechanical engineering from University of Illinois-Chicago. He was awarded NASA Graduate Student Research fellowship during his PhD. He carried out experiments in NASA's drop tower and Japan Microgravity Centre's drop tower. He investigated sooting and radiation on droplet combustion in microgravity.

After graduation, Manzello joined the National Institute of Standards and Technology as a National Research Council postdoctoral fellow in 2001 and worked for 20 years. He left in 2021, and joined Reax Engineering, Inc, as a technical advisor. He is currently a visiting professor at Institute of Fluid Science, Tohoku University. He is an associate editor for Fire Technology journal.

Manzello was the editor of the Encyclopedia of Wildfires and Wildland-Urban Interface Fires published in 2020.

=== Awards and honors ===
- 2015 Harry C. Biggelstone Award from the National Fire Protection Association for a paper "Characterizing Firebrand Exposure from Wildland-Urban Interface (WUI) Fires: Results from the 2007 Angora Fire" This is the first journal paper which investigated the firebrand exposure from wildland-urban interface fires.
- 2017 Samuel Wasley Stratton Award, National Institute of Standards and Technology "for his groundbreaking engineering and scientific research on the vulnerabilities of built structures to ignition from wind-driven firebrand showers produced from wildland-urban interface fires".
- 2024 Jack Bono Award for Engineering Communication from Society of Fire Protection Engineers for a paper "Use of Unmanned Aerial Systems in Outdoor Firefighting".
