= Beth Weckman =

Fire safety researcher

Elizabeth J. Weckman
- Education: University of Waterloo
- Awards: Arthur B. Guise Medal
- Scientific career
- Workplaces: University of Waterloo
- Thesis: The structure of the flowfield near the base of a medium-scale pool fire (1987)
- Website: uwaterloo.ca/mechanical-mechatronics-engineering/profile/ejweckma

Beth Weckman is a fire safety researcher and professor emeritus with the Department of Mechanical and Mechatronics Engineering at the University of Waterloo.

== Education ==
Weckman completed her undergraduate and graduate studies in mechanical engineering at the University of Waterloo. Her doctoral thesis "The structure of the flowfield near the base of a medium-scale pool fire" was completed in 1987.

== Career ==
In the early 1990s Weckman partnered with the fire department in the city of Kitchener, Ontario to support the design of training facilities for firefighters based in the scientific aspects of different types of fires. The success of the partnership led do a subsequent collaboration with Waterloo Region during the construction of the Waterloo Region Services Training and Research Complex which opened in 2002. The facility included a reconfigurable house allowing for research into specific house structures, wind scenarios, and the study of how the travel of gases influence how soon fire alarms go off. The project was supported by a $2.1 million federal grant by the Canadian Foundation for Innovation. Weckman and her students have also participated in controlled burn exercises such as the burning of a condemned barn in Puslinch Township during which cameras and laptops were used to measure the temperate of the roof, the ground and the midpoint in the bar.

Weckman's research has included the impact of climate change on the severity and extent of forest fires through the study of how invasive and non-invasive plan species burn and the ways fire responds to varying moisture content. She is also part of a research team using Artificial intelligence to predict what a fire will do using advanced mathematics and data science in order to safely route people out of a burning building.

== Awards ==
In 2026 Weckman was awarded the Arthur B. Guise Medal by the Society of Fire Protection Engineers in recognition of fire safety research related to fire dynamics and diagnostic techniques.
