= Guillermo Rein =

Professor of fire science

Guillermo Rein Soto-Yarritu OYC
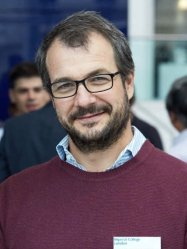
- Born: Madrid, Spain
- Education: ICAI School of Engineering; University of Texas at Austin; University of California at Berkeley
- Awards: Fellow of The Combustion Institute; Sugden Award; Arthur B. Guise Medal; Hinshelwood Prize; Officer's Cross of the Order of Isabella the Catholic
- Scientific career
- Fields: Fire, Combustion, Heat Transfer
- Workplaces: University of Edinburgh; Imperial College London
- Doctoral advisor: Carlos Fernandez-Pello

Guillermo Rein (born May 1975) is a professor of fire science in the Department of Mechanical Engineering at Imperial College London. His research is focused on fire, combustion, and heat transfer. He is the editor-in-chief of the journal Fire Technology and Fellow of the Combustion Institute.

Rein is best known for his contributions to smouldering combustion research in the field of fire science.

== Biography ==
Rein obtained his Industrial Engineering degree at the ICAI School of Engineering in 1999. He studied mechanical engineering at the University of California, Berkeley, and obtained an MSc in 2003 and a PhD in 2005. He taught at the School of Engineering of the University of Edinburgh (2006–2012), where he was a senior lecturer before moving to Imperial College in 2012.

== Research ==
His research mainly focus on heat transfer, combustion, fire and wildfire. He is best known in three areas: polymer and wood ignition; design of fire-resistant structures; and wildfire spread and mitigation.

Rein, together with his research group and collaborators, has edited two books, published six book chapters and over 200 journal publications. His current h-index is above 60 and citation count is over 12,000 on Google Scholar.

Rein has been editor-in-chief of the journal Fire Technology since 2012. He was associate editor of Proceedings of the Combustion Institute from 2013 to 2019; associate editor of Thermal and Mass Transport (Frontiers of Mechanical Engineering) from 2016; and is on the editorial board of Safety Science and the advisory board of International Journal of Wildland Fire since 2016. He was also on the editorial board of Fire Safety Journal from 2014 to 2017.

== Selected awards ==
- 2009: Hinshelwood Prize
- 2016: SFPE Lund Award
- 2017: The Engineer Collaborate-to-Innovate Prize
- 2017: Sugden Award
- 2018: Arthur B. Guise Medal
- 2020: Research Excellence Award

Officer's Cross of the Order of Isabella the Catholic - ribbon for ordinary uniform

Officer's Cross of the Order of Isabella the Catholic
— 10 March 2025
