= Thomas Gernay =

Belgian-American fire safety engineer

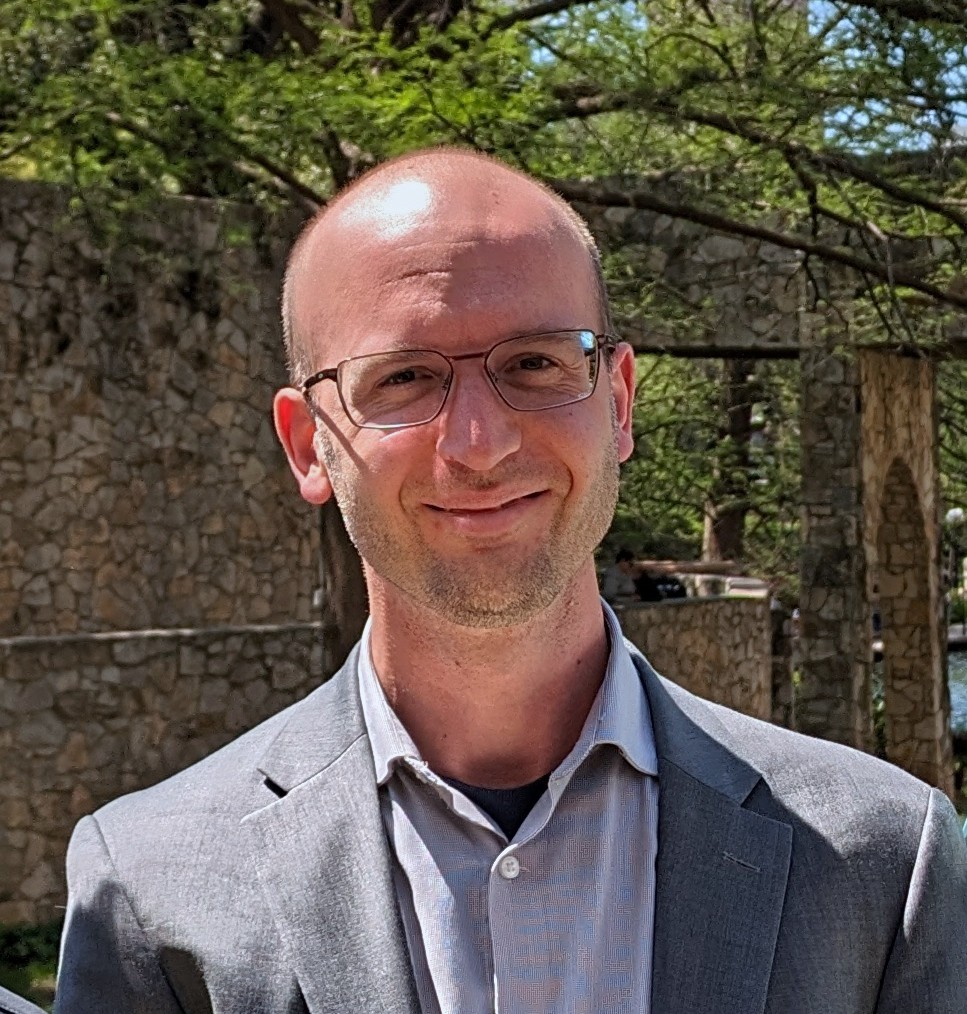
- Born: Belgium
- Citizenship: Belgium
- Education: University of Liège
- Known for: Structural fire engineering, performance-based design, co-developer of SAFIR
- Awards: NSF CAREER Award (2023), IAFSS Magnusson Early Career Award (2023), NFPA Foundation Medal (2019)
- Scientific career
- Fields: Structural engineering, fire safety engineering
- Workplaces: Johns Hopkins University, University of Liège, Princeton University
- Thesis: A multiaxial constitutive model for concrete in the fire situation including transient creep and cooling down phases (2012)
- Doctoral advisor: Jean-Marc Franssen

Thomas Gernay is a Belgian-American structural engineer and fire safety scientist. He is an associate professor in the Department of Civil and Systems Engineering at Johns Hopkins University, where he leads research in structural fire engineering, performance-based design, and structural reliability.

== Education ==
Gernay earned his bachelor's and master's degrees in civil engineering from the University of Liège in Belgium. He completed his PhD at the same institution in 2012, developing a multiaxial constitutive model for concrete under fire conditions.

== Career ==
After completing his PhD, Gernay held postdoctoral fellowships at Princeton University (as a Fulbright and BAEF fellow) and at the University of Liège. He joined Johns Hopkins University in 2018 as an Assistant Professor and became an associate professor in 2025.

He is a co-developer of the structural fire simulation software SAFIR, widely used for modeling the behavior of building structures in fire. Gernay has contributed to international building standards, including the American Iron and Steel Institute's fire design appendix (AISI S100-2024) and the ACI CODE-562 for concrete structures. Gernay's research spans fire safety engineering, performance-based design, structural reliability, and community resilience. He has published extensively on the behavior of steel, concrete, and timber structures in fire and on the use of machine learning in fire performance modeling.

== Awards ==
Gernay has received several prestigious awards, including:

- NSF CAREER Award (2023) for work on performance-based fire design for cold-formed steel structures
- IAFSS Magnusson Early Career Award (2023)
- AISC Early Career Terry Peshia Faculty Award (2023)
- NFPA Foundation Medal (2019)

== Selected works ==
- Gernay, T., (2024). "Performance-based design for structures in fire: Advances, challenges, and perspectives." Fire Safety Journal, 142, 104036.
- Gernay T. (2019). "Fire resistance and burnout resistance of reinforced concrete columns". Fire Safety Journal, 104, 67-78.
- Gernay, T., Elhami Khorasani, N. (2020). "Recommendations for performance-based fire design of composite steel buildings using computational analysis." Journal of Constructional Steel Research, 166.
