= David Anthony Purser =

Professor David Anthony Purser CBE is a British toxicologist.

Purser attended Bedford School. He graduated from Birmingham University with a BSc degree in Zoology in 1966, and a PhD in Neurocommunications in 1969. Purser has worked for over 35 years on fire toxicity and human evacuation behavior. He has been Director of Hartford Environmental Research since 2006. He is a visiting professor at the University of Greenwich and University of Central Lancashire. He has previously been a visiting professor at the University of Bolton and University of Ulster. He has been a member of the Adjunct Faculty of the University of Maryland. Purser has chaired Fire Engineering and Toxicity committees in British Standards and ISO, is a member of the scientific committee of the US National Association of State Fire Marshals, and wrote the chapter on Assessment of Hazards to Occupants in the Society of Fire Protection Engineers' Handbook. Purser was awarded the Rasbash Medal by the Institution of Fire Engineers in 2013 in recognition of his contribution to the advancement of knowledge in fire behaviour. He is a medalist of the GIDIA Fire Research Centre at the University of Cantabria. He was appointed a Commander of the Order of the British Empire in the 2015 New Year Honours for services to Fire Safety.
