= Environment, health and safety =

Balance of occupational safety and environmental protection

Health, safety and environment (HSE) (or environment, health and safety –EHS–, or safety, health and environment –SHE–) is an interdisciplinary field focused on the study and implementation of practical aspects environmental protection and safeguard of people's health and safety, especially in an occupational context. It is what organizations must do to make sure that their activities do not cause harm. Commonly, quality - quality assurance and quality control - is adjoined to form QHSE or equivalent initialisms.

== Activities ==
HSE involves different activities depending on the three different standpoints:

safety
creating organized efforts and procedures for identifying workplace hazards and reducing accidents and exposure to harmful situations and substances. It also includes training of personnel in accident prevention, accident response, emergency preparedness, and use of protective clothing and equipment.
health
creating the development of safe, high-quality, and environmentally friendly processes, working practices and systemic activities that prevent or reduce the risk of harm to people in general, operators, or patients.
environmental
creating a systematic approach to complying with environmental regulations, such as managing waste or air emissions all the way to helping site's reduce the carbon footprint.

The activities of an HSE working group might focus on:

- Exchange of know-how regarding health, safety and environmental aspects of a material
- Promotion of good working practices, such as post-use material collection for recycling

== Regulatory requirements ==
Regulatory requirements play an important role in HSE discipline and HSE managers must identify and understand relevant HSE regulations, the implications of which must be communicated to executive management so the company can implement suitable measures. Organizations based in the United States are subject to HSE regulations in the Code of Federal Regulations, particularly CFR 29, 40, and 49. Still, HSE management is not limited to legal compliance and companies should be encouraged to do more than is required by law, if appropriate.

== Other names ==
Notwithstanding the individual importance of these attributes, the various institutions and authors have accented the acronyms differently. Successful HSE programs also include measures to address ergonomics, air quality, and other aspects of workplace safety that could affect the health and well-being of employees and the overall community. Another researcher transformed it as SHE in 1996, while exploring the "concept of 'human quality' in terms of living standards that must follow later than the health.....[as per the] paradigm of QHSE, ....raising up the importance of environment to the 'safety of people as a prime consideration'". It is because "Safety First" is called in for the commitment to transform the safety culture of countries. Quality is "fitness for purpose", and without it, each and every endeavour will be futile.

Abbreviations used include:

Acronym	Name	Group
OHS	Occupational health and safety	Occupational safety and health
WHS	Work health and safety	Occupational safety and health
HSE	Health, safety and environment	Health, safety and environment
EHS	Environment, health and safety	Health, safety and environment
SHE	Safety, health and environment	Health, safety and environment
QHSE	Quality, health, safety, and environment	Quality, health, safety, and environment
HSEQ	Health, safety, environment and quality	Quality, health, safety, and environment
HSSE	Health, safety, security and environment	Health, safety, security and environment
QHSSE	Quality, health, safety, security, and environment	Quality, health, safety, security, and environment
HSSEQ	Health, safety, security, environment, and quality	Quality, health, safety, security, and environment

== History ==
The chemical industry introduced the first formal HSE management approach in 1985 as a reaction to several catastrophic accidents (like the Seveso disaster of July 1976 and the Bhopal disaster of December 1984). This worldwide voluntary initiative, called "Responsible Care", started by the Chemistry Industry Association of Canada (formerly the Canadian Chemical Producers' Association - CCPA), operates in about 50 countries, with central coordination provided by the International Council of Chemical Associations (ICCA). It involves eight fundamental features which ensure plant and product safety, occupational health and environmental protection, but which also try to demonstrate by image-building campaigns that the chemical industry acts in a responsible manner. Being an initiative of the ICCA, it is restricted to the chemical industry.

Since the 1990s, general approaches to HSE management that may fit any type of organisation have appeared in international standards such as: The Valdez Principles, that have been formulated to guide and evaluate corporate conduct towards the environment.

- The Eco-Management and Audit Scheme (EMAS), developed by the European Commission in 1993
- ISO 14001 for environmental management in 1996
- ISO 45001 for occupational health and safety management in 2018, preceded by OHSAS 18001 1999

In 1998 the International Finance Corporation established EHS guidelines.

== Topics ==
General topics covered by HSE include:

- Environmental
  - Air emissions and ambient air quality
  - Energy conservation
  - Wastewater and ambient water quality
  - Water conservation
  - Waste management
  - Noise
  - Contaminated land
- Occupational health and safety
  - Physical hazards
  - Chemical hazards
  - Biological hazards
  - Radiological hazards
  - Special hazard environments
  - Personal protective equipment (PPE)
  - Communication and training
  - Monitoring
- Community health and safety
  - Water quality and availability
  - Structural safety of project infrastructure
  - Life and fire safety (LFS)
  - Traffic safety
  - Transport of hazardous materials
  - Disease prevention
  - Emergency preparedness and response

== Regulatory agencies ==
=== Canada ===
- Canadian Centre for Occupational Health and Safety (CCOHS)

=== United Kingdom ===
- The Health and Safety Executive
- The Environment Agency
- Local authorities

=== United States ===
- Federal / international
  - Occupational Safety and Health Administration (OSHA)
  - Environmental Protection Agency (EPA)
  - Nuclear Regulatory Commission (NRC)
  - Mine Safety and Health Administration (MSHA)
  - Bureau of Safety and Environmental Enforcement (BSEE)
- State
  - California Division of Occupational Safety and Health, New York Department of Health, Safety and Health Council of North Carolina, etc.
- Local
  - Municipal fire departments (building code inspections)

=== Zambia ===
- Environmental Management Agency (ZEMA)
- Radiation Protection Authority
- Occupational Health and Safety Institute
- Mines Safety Department

=== India ===
- Environment Health and Safety Association

== Publications ==
- EHS Today
- Environmental Leader
- ISHN
- OHS
- Safety+Health Magazine – National Safety Council

== See also ==
- Environmental security – Field of study on environmental threats
- Occupational safety and health – Field concerned with the safety, health and welfare of people at work
- National Safety Council – American nonprofit public service organization
- Robert W. Campbell Award – Environmental, health, and safety award named in honor of Robert W. Campbell, an Award for Business Excellence through EHS Management.
- Safety engineering – Engineering discipline
