= Patrick van Hees =

Belgian fire-safety scientist

- Born: Essen, Belgium
- Citizenship: Belgium
- Education: Ghent University (MSc, PhD); KIHA Technical University Antwerp (BEng)
- Known for: Chairing ISO/TC 92 and ISO/TC 92/SC 1; leadership in the International Association for Fire Safety Science
- Awards: FORUM Mid-Career Researcher Award (2014), Interflam Trophy (2019), SFPE Jack Bono Award (2016)
- Scientific career
- Fields: Fire safety engineering
- Workplaces: Lund University; Ghent University; SP Technical Research Institute of Sweden
- Thesis: Wind aided flame spread of floor coverings (1995)

Patrick van Hees is a Belgian fire-safety scientist and professor of Fire Safety Engineering at Lund University in Sweden. He is active in international standards work and professional associations in fire safety science.

== Education ==
Van Hees studied engineering in Belgium and completed a PhD at Ghent University in 1995 on wind-aided flame spread of floor coverings.

== Career ==
Van Hees joined Lund University as professor in fire safety engineering, with research in reaction-to-fire of products, performance-based fire safety engineering and modelling of fire development, as reflected in his peer-reviewed publications. Previously, he worked in fire testing and research in Sweden at SP Fire Technology (now part of RISE).

Van Hees has served on journal editorial boards in the field. He is listed on the editorial board of Fire Safety Journal and on the editorial board of Fire and Materials at Wiley.

== Standards and professional service ==
As of 2025, Van Hees chairs ISO/TC 92/SC 1 Fire initiation and growth with a term running until the end of 2028. He has also been active in the International Association for Fire Safety Science (IAFSS), including roles connected with the IAFSS symposia and governance.

== Awards and honours ==
At the 11th IAFSS Symposium in 2014, Van Hees received the FORUM Mid-Career Researcher Award from the International FORUM of Fire Research Directors. He and co-authors Nils Johansson and Stefan Svensson received the 2016 SFPE Educational and Scientific Foundation Jack Bono Award for Engineering Communications for their 2015 Fire Technology paper “A Study of Reproducibility of a Full-Scale Multi-Room Compartment Fire Experiment.” In 2019 he received the Interflam Trophy for overall contribution to fire safety science. In 2024, he was an Erskine Fellow at the University of Canterbury in Christchurch, New Zealand.

== Selected works ==
Van Hees has published on reaction-to-fire testing, enclosure fires and façade fire safety. Examples include the 2015 paper on reproducibility in a full-scale multi-room fire experiment in Fire Technology, and work on the development of full-scale façade tests within ISO/TC 92.
