= Dieter Langbein =

German physicist

Dieter Langbein, Dr. phil. nat., was a German physicist, whose fields of research included solid state physics, fluid physics and microgravity. He was born on 10 February 1932 in Frankfurt am Main, Germany as Werner Dietrich Langbein and died on 25 June 2004 in Bad Homburg, Germany. He was married and had a son and two daughters.

== Early days ==
In 1951 Dieter Langbein started his studies in mathematics at the Johann Wolfgang Goethe-Universität at Frankfurt am Main, where he met Prof. Friedrich Hund who inspired him to work in theoretical physics. After his diploma in physics in 1956 and his thesis on solid state physics in 1958 he went to the Institute of Theoretical Physics at Göttingen to work with Prof. Hund in investigating galvanomagnetic effects.

== Research ==
In 1962 he joined Farbwerke Hoechst AG where he worked on thermodynamics and reaction kinetics. Dieter Langbein's scientific career was characterized by working closely with experimental physicists as well as with chemists and biologists. He achieved this by joining Battelle-Institut e.V., Frankfurt am Main in 1964. His work on the splitting of the electronic band structure in magnetic fields together with E. Gerlach led to a guest professorship at James Frank Institute, University of Chicago, Illinois in 1967/1968 followed by a stay at the Battelle Memorial Institute in Columbus, Ohio. His research led to the later Hofstadter's butterfly of the electron's energy bands structure. In 1969 he receives the venia legendi for physics at Frankfurt University and in 1972 he becomes Honorary Professor.

Back at Battelle-Institute Frankfurt he turned to the field of Van der Waals force. After a Visiting Fellowship at the University of Canberra, Australia he published in 1974 his book Theory of Van der Waals attraction.

Around 1976 he learned about the fascination of research under microgravity conditions. He set up a table of about a dozen effects contributing to the separation of monotectic alloys during solidification observed in rocket experiments. His microgravity experiments with transparent liquids proved the importance of the Marangoni effect. He became a member of the managing committee of ELGRA (European Low Gravity Research Association) in 1978, chairman of the German consulting group on fluid physics under low gravity and was scientific consultant at ESA, NASA and JAMIC. Together with the Kennedy Space Center, Florida, he 1985 established The Microgravity Research Experiments (MICREX) Database, for which he was the principal investigator. The collaboration with NASA facilitated some more results, such as those related to the German Spacelab Mission where he became friend with German physicist and astronaut Ulf Merbold and the advances in space research and other fluid physics studies.

In 1993 he left Battelle and continued his work at the Center of Applied Space Technology and Microgravity (ZARM) at the University of Bremen, Germany.

== Publications ==
In 1969 Langbein published an article in which he demonstrated that the electron's energy sub-band disposal presents regularities which are connected to the Landau levels.

In 1974 he published his first book, Theory of Van der Waals attraction.

In 2002 he published his second book Capillary Surfaces: Shape - Stability - Dynamics in particular under weightlessness about the capillary effect.

Between 1956 and 2001 he published more than 160 articles.
