= James Quintiere =

American mechanical engineer, known for his work on fire safety

James G. Quintiere
- Born: May 5, 1940
- Died: December 23, 2024 (aged 84)
- Education: New Jersey Institute of Technology (B.S., 1962), New York University (M.S., 1966; Ph.D., 1970)
- Engineering career
- Discipline: Mechanical engineering
- Institutions: A. James Clark School of Engineering at the University of Maryland
- Awards: 1998 Harry C. Bigglestone Award from the National Fire Protection Association, 2006 Arthur B. Guise Medal from the Society of Fire Protection Engineers

James G. Quintiere was an American mechanical engineer known for his work on fire protection engineering and fire safety. He was professor emeritus in the Department of Fire Protection Engineering at the University of Maryland's A. James Clark School of Engineering. A noted expert on arson, he testified in criminal trials regarding the causes of certain fires, such as the one that occurred in the Waco siege and killed over 80 people. He also studied the causes of the collapse of the World Trade Center, concluding that it was probably caused by faulty fireproofing. He died on December 12, 2024.

== Career ==
Quintiere's career in fire safety began in 1971, when he joined the National Institute of Science and Technology (NIST). He left the NIST in 1989, where he was the Chief of the Fire Science and Engineering Division, to become a professor at the University of Maryland. He was named the John L. Bryan Chair in Fire Protection Engineering at the University of Maryland in 1999.

== Society affiliations and awards ==
Quintiere was a fellow of the Society of Fire Protection Engineers (SFPE) and the American Society of Mechanical Engineers. In 1998, he received the Harry C. Bigglestone Award from the National Fire Protection Association. In 2006, he received the SFPE's Arthur B. Guise Medal.
