= David Rasbash =

British fire safety engineer

David Rasbash was a British engineer and pioneer in the field of Fire Safety Engineering.

Rasbash was a chemical engineer who graduated from Imperial College, London, during World War II. He began publishing and teaching about the evaluation of fire safety in the 1970s. In his early career, he conducted research on techniques for fire extinction to assist firefighters. He also was interested in the production of smoke and its effect on visibility. He was an early proponent of the standardization of automatic fire detection and later became involved in the evaluation of fire safety and the quantification of risk. His contributions to these subjects have become standard references.

After working for the Fire Research Station, Rasbash was appointed at the University of Edinburgh as the first ever Professor of Fire Safety Engineering.

Every year, during The Rasbash Lecture, recipients of the Rasbash Award are chosen based on their eminence in fire safety engineering education, research and practice, worldwide. The award is given by The Institution of Fire Engineers.

Rasbash died in 1997.
