= Bart Merci =

Belgian fire-safety scientist

- Citizenship: Belgium
- Education: Ghent University
- Known for: Fire and smoke dynamics; founding director of the International Master of Science in Fire Safety Engineering
- Awards: Arthur B. Guise Medal (2023); FORUM Mid-Career Researcher Award (2021); Fellow of The Combustion Institute (2019)
- Scientific career
- Fields: Fire safety science, combustion engineering
- Workplaces: Ghent University, KU Leuven, Technical University of Denmark, University of Science and Technology of China
- Thesis: Modelling of turbulent non-premixed flames (2000)

Bart Merci is a professor of Fire Safety Science and Engineering at the Faculty of Engineering and Architecture at Ghent University . He is the founding director of the International Master of Science in Fire Safety Engineering (IMFSE) consortium. He is internationally recognised for his research on fire and smoke dynamics and is the editor-in-chief of Fire Safety Journal.

== Education ==
Merci earned an MSc in electro-mechanical engineering from Ghent University in 1997 and completed his PhD in 2000 on the modelling of turbulent non-premixed flames.

== Career ==
After completing a postdoctoral fellowship with the Research Foundation – Flanders (FWO), he expanded his research into fire safety and established the "Fire Safety Science and Engineering" research unit at Ghent University. Merci has held a 10% guest professorship at KU Leuven since 2015. He was Otto Monsted Guest Professor at the Technical University of Denmark in 2016 and has served as a guest professor at the University of Science and Technology of China since 2022.

Since 2015, he has been Editor-in-Chief of Fire Safety Journal and is involved in managing the International Master of Science in Fire Safety Engineering (IMFSE). He has supervised over 20 completed PhD dissertations and 150 master's theses.

== Awards ==
Merci has received several awards:

- Arthur B. Guise Medal, Society of Fire Protection Engineers (2023)
- FORUM Mid-Career Researcher Award (2021)
- Fellow, The Combustion Institute (2019)
- SFPE David A. Lucht Lamp of Knowledge Award (2018, for IMFSE)
- Officer in the Order of Leopold, Belgian Government (2015)
- Laureate, Royal Flemish Academy of Belgium – Technical Sciences (2014)

== Selected works ==
- B. Merci & T. Beji, Fluid Mechanics Aspects of Fire and Smoke Dynamics in Enclosures, 2nd ed., CRC Press (2022).
- X.P. Sun et al., "Fundamentals of window-ejected fire plumes from under-ventilated compartment fires," Progress in Energy and Combustion Science 94 (2022).
- B. Merci, G. Maragkos & J. Li, "On the importance of the heat release rate in numerical simulations of fires in mechanically ventilated airtight enclosures," Proceedings of the Combustion Institute (2022).
- G. Maragkos, T. Beji & B. Merci, "Advances in modelling in CFD simulations of turbulent gaseous pool fires," Combustion and Flame 181 (2017).
