= Jose L. Torero =

Peruvian fire protection engineer

José Luis Torero
- Torero in the Fire Lab of the University of Edinburgh
- Born: Lima, Peru
- Education: Pontificia Universidad Católica del Perú, University of California, Berkeley
- Known for: Smouldering combustion, spacecraft fire safety, forensic fire analysis
- Awards: Arthur B. Guise Medal, Tam Dalyell Prize, Lord Ezra Award
- Scientific career
- Fields: Fire safety engineering, combustion science
- Workplaces: University College London, University of Queensland, University of Maryland, University of Edinburgh
- Doctoral advisor: Carlos Fernández-Pello

José Luis Torero is a Peruvian fire protection engineer and academic. He is currently the Head of the Department of Civil, Environmental and Geomatic Engineering at University College London. Torero has held leading academic and research positions in the United Kingdom, Australia, and the United States, and is internationally recognised for his work in fire dynamics, smouldering combustion, and disaster resilience. He is a Fellow of the Royal Academy of Engineering, the Royal Society of Edinburgh, the Australian Academy of Technological Sciences and Engineering, and the Royal Society of New South Wales.

== Career ==
Torero completed a Bachelor of Science in Mechanical Engineering at the Pontificia Universidad Católica del Perú and earned a PhD from the University of California, Berkeley, where he studied smouldering combustion under the supervision of Carlos Fernández-Pello.

His academic career includes:

- Associate Professor, Department of Fire Protection Engineering, University of Maryland
- BRE Trust / Royal Academy of Engineering Chair in Fire Safety Engineering, and Director of the BRE Centre for Fire Safety Engineering, University of Edinburgh (2004–2012)
- Head of the School of Civil Engineering, University of Queensland (2012–2017)
- John L. Bryan Chair in Fire Protection Engineering and Director of the Center for Disaster Resilience, University of Maryland (2017–2019)
- Head of the Department of Civil, Environmental and Geomatic Engineering, University College London (2019–present)

He has also served as a Chargé de recherche with the French National Centre for Scientific Research.

== Research ==
Torero's research focuses on fire dynamics, smouldering combustion, flame spread, microgravity combustion, fire suppression systems, and fire safety education. While based in Edinburgh, he developed expertise in structural behaviour in fire and combustion-based remediation of contaminated land.

At the University of Queensland, Torero collaborated with NASA on the SAFFIRE project, conducting large-scale spacecraft fire safety experiments.

He also led the development of the Cladding Materials Library, offering reliable flammability data to architects and designers.

Torero was a co-founder of the IAFSS Working Group on Measurement and Computation of Fire Phenomena (MaCFP), which promotes fundamental fire science.

== Role in Mexico forensic investigation ==
Torero served as a technical expert to the United Nations Committee on Enforced Disappearances (CED) during the investigation of the Iguala mass kidnapping. His experimental work on open-air cremation refuted the official account provided by Mexican authorities.

== Editorial roles ==
- Editor-in-Chief, Fire Safety Journal (2010–2016)
- Editorial Board Member: Fire Technology, Progress in Energy and Combustion Science

== Honours and awards ==
- Fellow, Royal Academy of Engineering (2010)
- Fellow, Royal Society of Edinburgh (2008)
- Fellow, Australian Academy of Technological Sciences and Engineering (2014)
- Fellow, Royal Society of New South Wales (2018)
- Tam Dalyell Prize, University of Edinburgh (2010)
- Lord Ezra Award, Combustion Engineering Association (2009)
- Arthur B. Guise Medal, Society of Fire Protection Engineers (2008)
- Bodycote Warrington Fire Research Prize (2007)
- FM Global Award, Fire and Explosions Hazard Seminar (2007)
- William M. Carey and Harry C. Bigglestone Best Paper Awards (2001)
