= Lorraine M. Martin =

American CEO

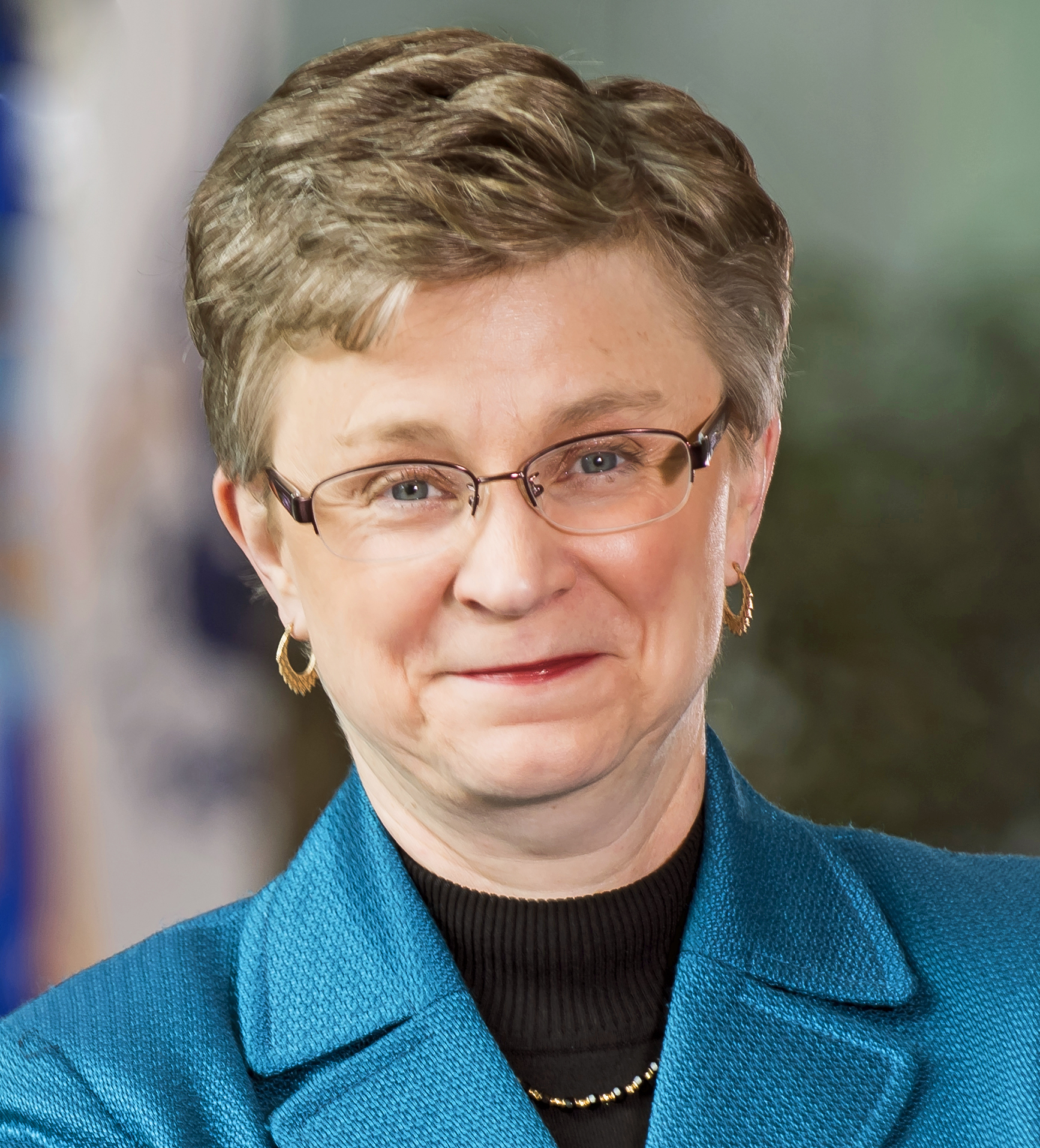

Lorraine M. Martin is an American CEO. She has been president and CEO of the National Safety Council, a 107-year old nonprofit dedicated to eliminating preventable deaths, since June 2019. She serves on the Kennametal Board of Directors and is the co-founder and president of the Pegasus Springs Foundation, a non-profit organization focused on educational equity and collaboration.

Ms. Martin served as Executive Vice President and Deputy for Lockheed Martin’s Rotary and Mission Systems (RMS) business area, which operates over 1,000 programs with more than 34,000 personnel around the world. RMS programs include the Aegis Combat System, Littoral Combat Ship and Sikorsky helicopters

She was tapped to help lead RMS in 2016, after her leadership of Lockheed Martin Aeronautics F-35 Lightning II Program as Executive Vice President and General Manager earned Pentagon accolades and recognition for reducing program costs while simultaneously increasing production and fielding more aircraft worldwide.

== Career ==
Martin began her career in the 1980s as an officer in the U.S. Air Force, serving in several leadership positions for software intensive technology and development programs.

Following the Air Force, Martin joined Lockheed Martin at Unisys Defense Systems (which became Lockheed Martin) in 1988 as program manager for computer security contracts in support of the Strategic Defense Initiative and the YF-23 fighter aircraft program. She led command, control and intelligence programs, quickly established her leadership and business acumen, going on to hold larger roles.

As executive vice president and general manager of the F-35 Lightning II program, Martin is credited with reducing costs while simultaneously increasing production and fielding aircraft worldwide. Her tenure with Lockheed Martin also includes serving as vice president for all aspects of the C-130 Hercules and C-5 Galaxy transport aircraft, and as Vice President of the Flight Solutions, Simulation, Training and Support business area, leading the aircrew training programs for the U.S. Air Force Special Operations Command, C-130 Hercules, F-16 Fighting Falcon, F-22 Raptor, F-15 Eagle and F-35 Lightning II, as well as flight simulation systems for the U.S. Navy and Marine Corps. She also led the expansion of Lockheed Martin's training business to numerous international training contracts. Her career began leading command, control and intelligence programs.

She retired from Lockheed Martin in May 2018 after 30 years.

At the helm of the National Safety Council, Martin has made a commitment to helping people live their fullest lives by focusing on workplace, roadway and impairment safety. She is the current chair of the national Road to Zero Coalition, aiming to eliminate roadway fatalities through collaboration with more than 1,500 organizations, including the United States Department of Transportation and its modal agencies. She has championed the role of technology in creating safer workplaces, as well as encouraging business leaders to take action on the opioid epidemic. During the coronavirus epidemic, Martin led a task force to identify and share best practices as well as corporate playbooks to enable businesses to bring employees back to work or continue working safely.

Martin is a champion for diversity and inclusion, with a focus of advancing women in STEM, and speaks around the world about the importance of supporting and promoting women in STEM careers.

Over the course of her career, Martin has worked with organizations in support of this mission, including Girls Inc, Girls Who Code and Blue Ribbon Schools of Excellence, where she served on the Board of Directors. She has also served on nonprofit boards, including INROADS, Big Brothers Big Sisters of Orlando and the Cobb County GA Arts Council.

== Education ==
Martin holds a Master of Science in computer science from Boston University and a Bachelor of Arts in computational mathematics from DePauw University.
