= Dalmarnock fire tests =

Series of fire experiments on high-rise buildings

Outside view of Dalmarnock Fire Test One

The Dalmarnock fire tests are a series of fire experiments that were conducted in a real high-rise building in the United Kingdom.

In 2006, the BRE Centre for Fire Safety Engineering at the University of Edinburgh conducted this series of large-scale fire tests in a high-rise building in collaboration with the BBC series Horizon, EPSRC, Glasgow Housing Association, Strathclyde Fire Brigade, Glasgow Caledonian University, Lion TV, Arup, BRE, Xtralis and Powerwall Systems Ltd, among other contributors.

== Description ==
The building, a 23-storey reinforced-concrete tower located at 4 Millerfield Place in Dalmarnock, Glasgow, was scheduled for demolition and hence was empty of tenants. Three main experiments were conducted over two days, from 25 to 26 July 2006. Tests One and Two took place in identical flats, the main compartment of which had been fitted with regular living room and office furniture, arranged to provide conditions that favour repeatability. Test Three was a smaller smoke management experiment held in one of the two main emergency exit stairwells.

Tests One and Two were fully instrumented with a high sensor density, including measurements of temperature, incident heat, gas velocities, smoke obscuration, wall temperature and structure deflection, among others. The tests varied in that Test One allowed the fire to develop freely to post-flashover conditions, while Test Two incorporated sensor-informed ventilation management and was extinguished before post-flashover conditions were attained. Both tests had approximately 300 sensors monitoring several different characteristics of the fire environment, but Test One had about 160 additional sensors monitoring the structural response.

These experiments endeavoured to establish a highly monitored fire in a realistic residential scenario, allowing for several different modern fire safety engineering tools to be tested. The comprehensive set of data collected is being used for validation of different mathematical models of fire dynamics. Because the data has a spatial resolution high enough to be comparable to typical resolutions of CFD fire models, the tests are specially well suited for validation of this type of models. The tests also form an integral part of the research conducted for the FireGrid research project, that is, the development of emergency control systems that use continuous sensor data and computer modelling, to provide forecast of the fire evolution and aid the efficient deployment of resources.

== Analysis and dissemination ==
The overall aim of the Dalmarnock fire tests is to improve understanding of how building fire emergencies can be handled in the most effective manner, while providing further insights into the fundamentals of compartment fire dynamics and fire-induced structural behavior.

Dissemination of the findings includes several related journal and conference papers; a one-day seminar introducing the tests and highlighting the analysis and conclusions (Edinburgh, November 2007); and a book detailing the tests and analysis published in November 2007. The book, entitled The Dalmarnock Fire Tests: Experiments and Modelling, comprises material covering characterization and comparison of both the Test One and Test Two fires; experimental error analysis; evaluation of the fire detection systems; calculation of heat transfer to the structure; analysis of the structural behavior; evaluation of ceiling fiber reinforced polymer (FRP) performance; and comparison of both a priori and a posteriori computational fire modelling against experimental data.

== See also ==
- Fire test
- BRE Centre for Fire Safety Engineering
