= National Safety Month =

Annual observance in the United States

National Safety Month (NSM) is an annual month-long observance in the United States each June.

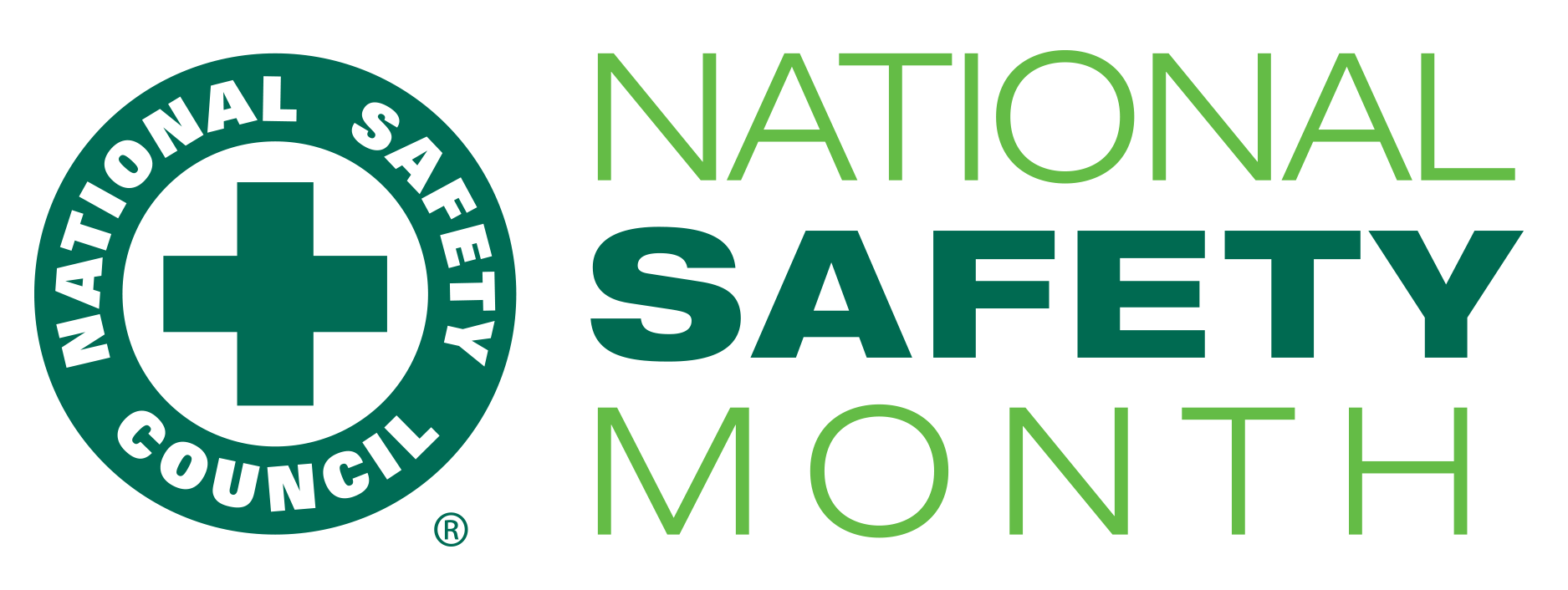
Official Badge of National Safety Month 2018

During National Safety Month, individuals and organizations participate by making efforts to reduce the leading causes of unintentional injury and death at work, on the road, and in homes and communities.

== History ==
In 1996, the National Safety Council established June as National Safety Month, aiming to increase awareness of the leading safety and health risks and ultimately decrease the number of unintentional injuries and deaths in the United States.

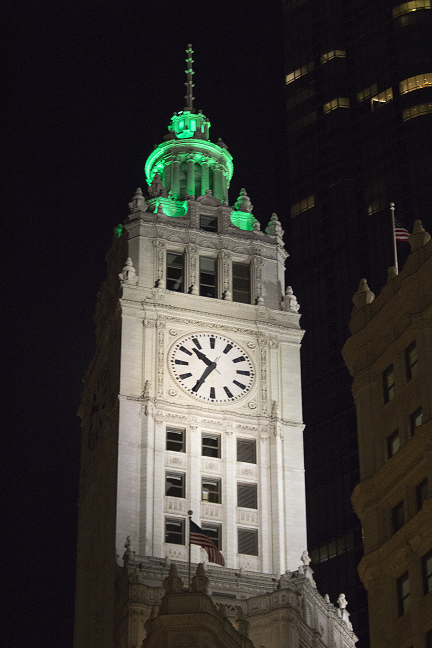
Wrigley Building in Chicago lit up green for National Safety Month in 2017

In 2017, several buildings in the city of Chicago lit their building lights green to show their support for National Safety Month.

== 2021 observance ==
Weekly topics are Prevent Incidents Before They Start, Address Ongoing COVID-19 Safety Concerns, It’s Vital to Feel Safe on the Job and Advance Your Safety Journey.

== National Safety Month 2018 ==
The theme for National Safety Month in June 2018 is "No 1 Gets Hurt". Each week in June correlates with a different safety topic:

=== Week 1 - Emergency Preparedness ===
Federal agencies, like Ready.gov, the National Oceanic and Atmospheric Administration and the Centers for Disease Control and Prevention, provide resources for emergency preparedness. Some 10,000 cardiac arrests occur each year in the workplace. Only 45% of American workers have had first aid training and only 50% know where to locate an automated external defibrillator.

=== Week 2 - Wellness ===
The Institute of Medicine estimates that 50-70 million Americans chronically suffer from a sleep disorder. For an individual, sleep disorders can have a substantial impact in reducing quality of life, increasing the risk of other health problems such as heart disease and diabetes, and even reducing lifespan.

=== Week 3 - Falls ===
Falls are the leading cause of injury-related death for adults age 65 and older. Falls are also the leading cause of death in construction according to OSHA.

=== Week 4 - Driving ===
Drowsy driving contributes to about 10 percent of all motor vehicle-related crashes, exceeding federal estimates by nearly eightfold, according to newly released research from the AAA Foundation for Traffic Safety.

== National Safety Month 2017 ==
The theme for National Safety Month in June 2017 was "Keep Each Other Safe," which underscored the role every individual plays in the effort to eliminate preventable deaths. Each week in June correlated with a different safety topic:

=== Week 1 - Stand Up to Falls ===
One in three older adults falls each year. About 2.5 million nonfatal falls were treated in emergency departments in 2013.

=== Week 2 - Recharge to Be in Charge ===
More than 70 million Americans suffer from sleep problems, according to research from the National Institutes of Health. Sleep disorders, like sleep apnea, can be serious enough to interfere with an employee's well-being. Approximately 13% of work injuries could be attributed to sleep problems.

=== Week 3 - Prepare for Active Shooters ===
An average of 70 people were wounded and 46 killed per year in active shooter events between 2014 and 2015.

=== Week 4 - Don't Just Sit There ===
Overexertion continues to be a leading cause of injury over all age groups. It was the second leading reason that adults age 25-64 ended up in emergency departments in 2013, and the third leading cause for kids ages 10 and older, often from too-heavy backpacks, computers and gaming, and poor posture.

== Light Your City's Skyline Green ==
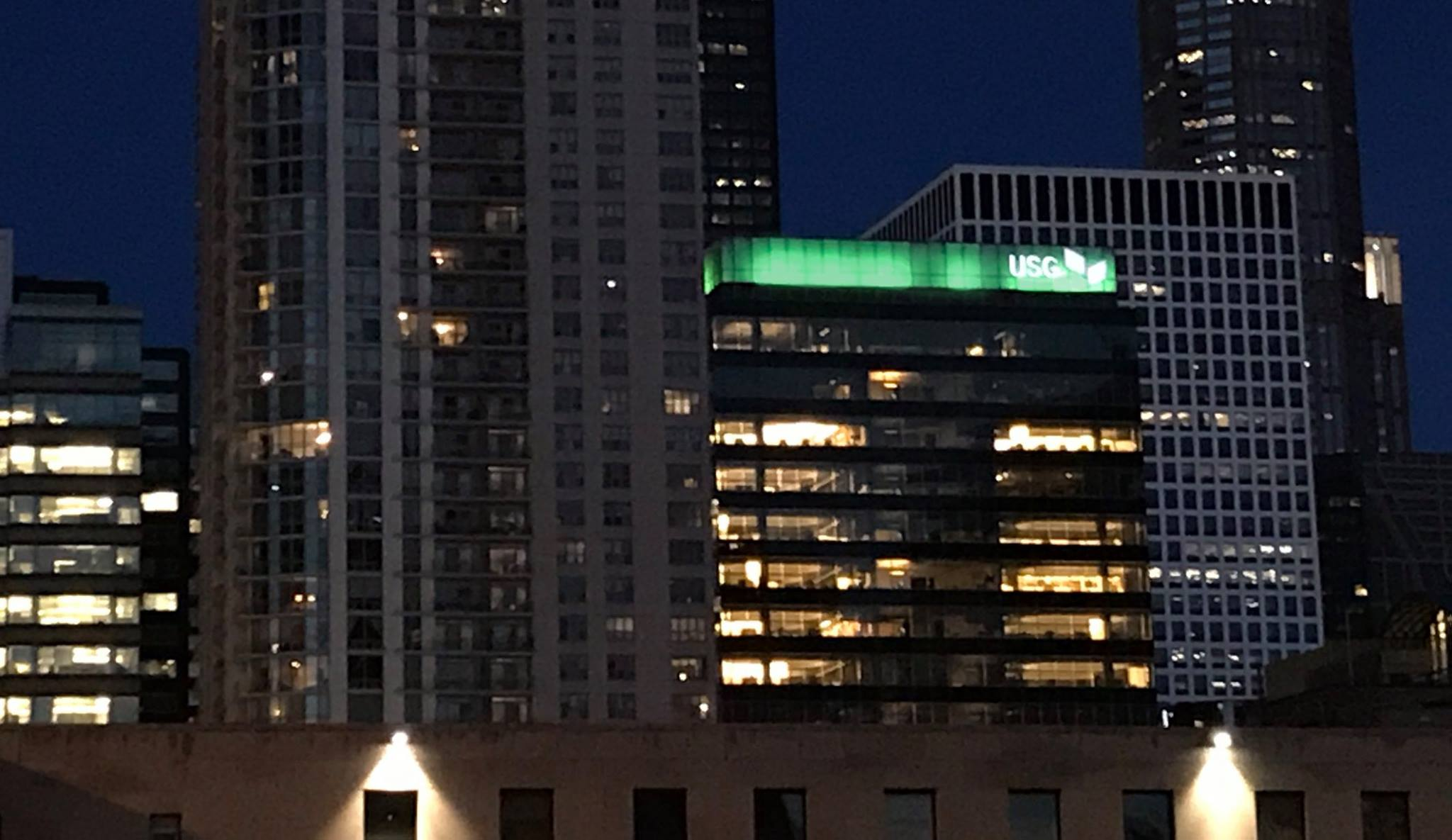
USG building of Chicago lit green for National Safety Month 2017

In 2017, the Building Owners and Managers Association of Chicago (BOMA) approved the Council's lighting request, and Blue Cross and Blue Shield of Illinois building, Prudential Plaza and The Wrigley Building, 400-410 North Michigan Ave., Chicago, Illinois, were lit green in June to show support for National Safety Month. The buildings participate in the BOMA Building Lighting Partner Program – an initiative to light up the skyline for various civic and philanthropic causes.
