= Fire Technology =

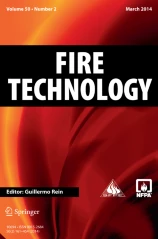
- Fire Technology cover
- Discipline: Engineering
- Language: English
- Edited by: Guillermo Rein

Publication details
- History: 1965-present
- Publisher: Springer (United States)
- Frequency: Quarterly
- Open access: Hybrid
- Impact factor: 2.3 (2023)

Standard abbreviations
- ISO 4: Fire Technol.

Indexing
- ISSN: 0015-2684 (print); 1572-8099 (web)
- OCLC no.: 48491306

Links
- Journal homepage

Fire Technology is a peer-reviewed journal publishing scientific research dealing with fire hazards facing humans and the environment. It publishes original contributions, both theoretical and empirical, that contribute to the solution of problems in fire safety and related fields. It is published by Springer in conjunction with the National Fire Protection Association and the Society of Fire Protection Engineers.

According to the Journal Citation Reports, the journal has a 2023 impact factor of 2.3. The Scopus's CiteScore 2023 of the journal is 6.6. According to the Scimago Journal & Country Rank, this journal is Q1 in Engineering.

Topics include material testing, fire modelling, detection and suppression, performance-based building design, building code, emergency evacuation and human behaviour, fire investigation, wildfire and fire risk analysis.

Annually, three awards are presented to the best papers appearing in Fire Technology. The Harry C. Bigglestone Award for excellence in communication of fire protection concepts is given by the Fire Protection Research Foundation to the best overall paper. The Jack Bono Award for engineering communications is given by The Society of Fire Protection Engineers' Educational and Scientific Foundation to the paper that has most contributed to the advancement of professional fire protection engineering. And the Tibor Z. Harmathy Award for the best paper led by a student given by Springer.

The Jack Watts Award for Outstanding Reviewer of Fire Technology is presented annually to those whose reviews were most valuable in terms of the quality, in-depth, number and timeliness.

== Harry C. Bigglestone Award ==
The Harry C. Bigglestone Award is given annually to the paper appearing in Fire Technology that best represents excellence in the communication of fire protection concepts. Accompanying this award is a US$2,000 cash prize from the Fire Protection Research Foundation.

It is named to honour the memory of Harry C. Bigglestone, who served as a trustee of the Fire Protection Research Foundation and chair of the NFPA Committee on Central Station Signaling Systems and who was a fellow and past president of the Society of Fire Protection Engineers.

=== Recipients ===
- 2022 - Dr. M. Z. Naser
- 2021- Nico de Koker, R. S. Walls, A. Cicione, Z. R. Sander, S. Löffel, J. J. Claasen, S. J. Fourie, L. Croukamp, and D. Rush
- 2020 - Jim McLennan, Barbara Ryan, Chris Bearman, and Keith Toh
- 2019 - Wojciech Wegrzyński, Tomasz Lipecki, Jason Lafferty
- 2018 - Ruben Van Coile, Georgios Balomenos, Mahesh Pandey, Robby Caspeele
- 2017 - Enrico Ronchi, Erica Kuligowski, Daniel Nilsson, Richard Peacock, Paul Reneke
- 2016 - Henrik Bjelland, Ove Njå, Atle William Heskestad and Geir Sverre Braut
- 2015 - Ethan I. D. Foote, Samuel L. Manzello
- 2014 - Ann Jeffers, Qianru Guo, Kaihang Shi, Zili Jia, Erica Kuligowski
- 2013 - Kristopher Overholt, Ofodike (D.K.) Ezekoye
- 2012 - Gregory T. Linteris
- 2011 - Robert Jansson and Lars Borstrom
- 2010 - Paul Mason, Charles Fleischmann, Chris Rogers, Alan McKinnon, Keith Unsworth, Michael Spearpoint
- 2009 - Tingguang Ma, Michael S. Klassen, Stephen M. Olenick, Richard J. Roby, Jose L. Torero
- 2008 - Bogdan Dlugogorski, Eric Kennedy, Ted Schaefer
- 2007 - Michael S. Klassen, Jason A. Sutula, Maclain M. Holton, Richard J. Roby, Thomas Izbicki
- 2006 - Brian Y. Lattimer, Uri Vandsburger, Richard J. Roby
- 2005 - Tingguang Ma, Stephen M. Olenick, Michael S. Klassen, Richard J. Roby, Jose L. Torero
- 2004 - Susan L. Rose-Pehrsson, Sean J. Hart, Thomas T. Street, Frederick W. Williams, Mark H. Hammond, Daniel T. Gottuk, Mark T. Wright, Jennifer T. Wong
- 2003 - Scott K. Anderson, Robert G. Bill Jr., Richard Ferron, Hsiang-Cheng Kung
- 2002 - Steven D. Wolin
- 2001 - James R. Lawson, William E. Mell
- 2000 - James A. Milke
- 1999 - Brian Y. Lattimer, Richard J. Roby, Uri Vandsburger
- 1998 - James Quintiere
- 1997 - Mohammed Sultan, Noah L. Ryder, Frederick Leprince, James A. Milke, Frederick W. Mowrer, Jose L. Torero
- 1996 - Thomas McAvoy, James A. Milke
- 1995 - Charles J. Kibert, Douglas Dierdorf
- 1994 - Robert G. Bill Jr., Hsiang-Cheng Kung
- 1993 - David J. O'Connor, Gordon W. H. Silcock
- 1992 - John R. Hall Jr., Ai Sekizawa
- 1991 - Frederick W. Mowrer
- 1990 - Homer W. Carhart, Francis R. Faith, J. Thomas Hughes, Curtis T. Ewing
- 1989 - Dingyi Huan, John Krasny, John Rockett
- 1988 - Frederick W. Mowrer, Robert Brady Williamson
- 1987 - Richard L. Smith
- 1986 - Peter F. Johnson
- 1985 - T. T. Lie, Kenneth J. Schwartz

== See also ==
- List of engineering awards
- List of occupational health and safety awards
