= Grunde Jomaas =

Norwegian fire-safety scientist

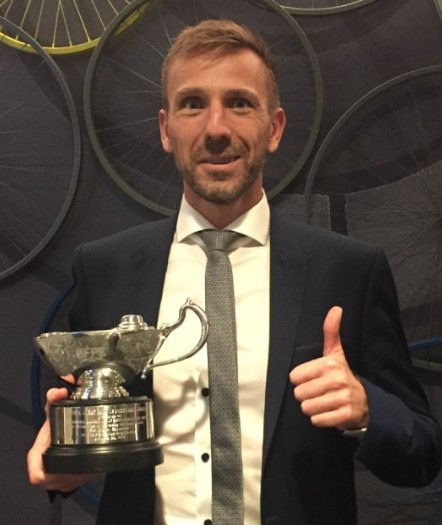
- Citizenship: Norway
- Education: University of Maryland (BSc); Princeton University (MSc, PhD)
- Known for: Flame-propagation research; spacecraft fire experiments; photovoltaic fire safety
- Awards: Bigglestone Award (2023); John L. Bryan Award (2021); David A. Lucht Lamp of Knowledge Award (2018); IFSJ “Influencer” (2024)
- Scientific career
- Fields: Fire safety science, combustion engineering
- Workplaces: ZAG; University of Primorska; University of Edinburgh; Technical University of Denmark
- Thesis: Propagation and Stability of Expanding Spherical Flames (2008)
- Doctoral advisor: C. K. Law

Grunde Jomaas is a Norwegian fire-safety scientist and engineer whose work includes combustion, fire dynamics, sustainable built environments, and fire safety related to emerging energy technologies. He is Executive Director of Fire & Risk Alliance's operations in the United Kingdom and Europe. He previously led the FRISSBE research programme at the Slovenian National Building and Civil Engineering Institute (ZAG) and has held academic positions at the University of Edinburgh and the Technical University of Denmark.

== Education ==
Jomaas earned a BSc in Fire Protection Engineering from the University of Maryland in 2001. He then obtained an MSc in 2005 and a PhD in Mechanical and Aerospace Engineering in 2008 at Princeton University.

== Career ==
After a short period as a staff engineer at Combustion Science and Engineering, Inc., Jomaas undertook post-doctoral research at École Centrale Paris (2008–2009). He joined the Technical University of Denmark in 2009, rising from assistant to associate professor and overseeing master’s programmes in fire safety and civil engineering. In 2016 he became Professor and BRE Chair of Fire Safety Engineering at the University of Edinburgh, where he also directed the local node of the International Master of Science in Fire Safety Engineering. Since 2021 he has led the EU-funded FRISSBE research centre at ZAG in Slovenia. He had visiting appointments at the University of Waterloo and the University of Queensland.

Jomaas’ research focus on fire dynamic using laboratory, field and micro-gravity experiments as well as analytical and numerical models. He has been collaborating with NASA for Saffire series of spacecraft-fire experiments.

== Awards and honours ==
Recognition for Jomaas’ contributions includes the NFPA Bigglestone Award for best fire-technology paper (2023) and the Society of Fire Protection Engineers’ John L. Bryan Award for mentoring (2021). In 2018, he shared the David A. Lucht Lamp of Knowledge Award.

== Selected works ==
- Jomaas, G., Zheng, X. L., Zhu, D. L., & Law, C. K. (2005). Experimental determination of counterflow ignition temperatures and laminar flame speeds of C2–C3 hydrocarbons at atmospheric and elevated pressures. Proceedings of the Combustion Institute, 30(1), 193-200.
- Jomaas, G., Law, C. K., & Bechtold, J. K. (2007). On transition to cellularity in expanding spherical flames. Journal of fluid mechanics, 583, 1-26.
- Poulsen, A., & Jomaas, G. (2012). Experimental study on the burning behavior of pool fires in rooms with different wall linings. Fire Technology, 48, 419-439.
