= Campbell Trophy =

Campbell Trophy may refer to:

- Campbell Trophy (Grand Prix), a race held between 1937 and 1939
- William V. Campbell Trophy, a National Football Foundation trophy awarded to college football players
- Clarence S. Campbell Bowl, a National Hockey League trophy awarded to the Western Conference playoff champions

== See also ==
- Campbell Award (disambiguation)
