= Campbell Award =

Campbell Award may refer to:

- John W. Campbell Memorial Award for Best Science Fiction Novel
- Astounding Award for Best New Writer, formerly the John W. Campbell Award for Best New Writer
- Robert W. Campbell Award, given by the National Safety Council
- Donald T. Campbell Award, given by the Society for Personality and Social Psychology

== See also ==
- Campbell Trophy (disambiguation)
