= Daniel Nilsson (academic) =

Swedish fire-safety engineer and academic

- Born: Lund, Sweden
- Citizenship: Swedish
- Education: Lund University
- Known for: Human behaviour in fire; virtual-reality evacuation experiments
- Scientific career
- Fields: Fire-safety engineering, evacuation science
- Workplaces: Lund University, University of Canterbury
- Thesis: Exit choice in fire emergencies – Influencing choice of exit with flashing lights (2009)
- Doctoral advisor: Göran Holmstedt, Håkan Frantzich

Daniel Nilsson is a Swedish fire-safety engineer whose research centres on how people behave during building and wildfire evacuations. He is professor of Fire Engineering at the University of Canterbury in Christchurch, New Zealand, and was head of its Civil and Natural Resources Engineering department from 2021 to 2024. Nilsson's work spans human behaviour in building fires, wildfires and tsunami evacuation, and he often uses virtual reality and GPS-based methods to study how people respond to warnings, signage and evacuation routes. Since 2014, Nilsson has represented Sweden on ISO Technical Committee 92/SC 4 Fire safety engineering, chairing the subcommittee (2014–2022) and, from 2023, convening its working group on human behaviour in fire. In 2017, the Swedish chapter of the Society of Fire Protection Engineers (BIV) awarded him the BIV-stipendiet for his contributions to research on human behaviour in fire, teaching and international standards work.

== Education ==
Nilsson was raised in Lund. He earned a B.Sc. in Fire Protection Engineering (2002) and a Ph.D. in Fire-safety Engineering (2009) at Lund University, the latter for work on how flashing lights influence evacuees' choice of exit. Lund University awarded him the title of docent in 2013.

== Career and research ==
From 2009 to 2018, Nilsson taught at Lund University, directing its Fire-safety Engineering programme from 2013. He joined the University of Canterbury in 2018 as professor of Fire Engineering. At Lund he lectured on human behaviour in fire for the International Master of Science in Fire Safety Engineering (IMFSE), where an IMFSE student blog nicknamed him a "mythbuster" for using the course to challenge common assumptions about panic and exit use in fires.

Nilsson’s research blends full-scale evacuation trials, virtual-reality studies and computer models to improve signage, way-finding and agent-based egress simulations. In Sweden he investigated how flashing lights and other visual cues affect evacuees' choice of exit, and a 2019 profile in the Swedish fire-safety magazine Brandsäkert notes that his group's results have influenced evacuation alarm design with light and sound and contributed to the evacuation design of Förbifart Stockholm. The same article highlights Nilsson's early adoption of virtual reality as a way to test evacuation systems in controlled, repeatable environments before moving to field trials.

Beyond building fires, Nilsson has worked on evacuation from wildfires and other large-scale hazards. He co-authored Fire and Emergency New Zealand's report The Pigeon Valley Fire: A questionnaire study about the evacuation process, which analysed how households perceived risk, received warnings and decided whether to evacuate during New Zealand’s largest recent wildfire. In an article for Engineering New Zealand he described a National Institute of Standards and Technology (NIST)–funded research project that uses anonymised GPS data from mobile phones to reconstruct when people evacuated, which routes they took and which communities were most affected during the 2019 Kincade Fire in California and other wildfires.

In New Zealand, Nilsson leads a joint research programme with Fire and Emergency New Zealand and partners including BRANZ, the Building Innovation Partnership, Halliwell Fire Research and GHD. The project uses virtual reality experiments to study how people with mobility impairments evacuate multi-storey buildings and to develop more inclusive evacuation systems and guidance tailored to the New Zealand context. Fire and Emergency has highlighted this work as a way to improve evacuation options for wheelchair and mobility-aid users, and reported that Nilsson presented aspects of the research at the AFAC24 conference.

Nilsson has also worked on tsunami evacuation problems since moving to New Zealand. In a 2019 interview he explained that his research in Christchurch includes how people would evacuate to tall buildings designed both to resist tsunamis and to act as refuges, and argued for evacuation systems that are easy to understand without prior training and tested with “real people” rather than based on intuition alone.

A significant strand of Nilsson's work critiques the use of "panic" as a catch-all explanation for crowd behaviour in fires. In a 2024 episode of the Fire Science Show podcast, he argued that many claims about panic in historical literature are myths and that fear of provoking panic has sometimes led authorities to withhold information from occupants, resulting in poorer decisions and slower evacuations. He has discussed related themes in the Uncovered Witness: Fire Science Revelations podcast, which features him as a guest in an episode on familiarity, affiliation and myths about panic and emphasises altruistic behaviour and the dangers of using “panic” as a scapegoat for technical failures.

Nilsson heads the BRANZ-funded project "Changing evacuation behaviour to meet densified housing needs" (2023–2025) and contributes to New Zealand's MBIE programme "Extreme Wildfire: Our new reality" (2021–2026) as well as the NIST GPS-tracking study of wildfire evacuations. Within ISO he helped draft ISO 20414:2020, the first international protocol for verifying and validating building-fire evacuation models.

== Selected works ==
- Nilsson, D. Exit Choice in Fire Emergencies – Influencing Choice of Exit with Flashing Lights. Ph.D. thesis, Lund University, 2009.
- Lovreglio, R.; Nilsson, D.; Kuligowski, E.; Cain, L.; Walpole, E.; Johnston, D.; Rothas, F. The Pigeon Valley Fire: A questionnaire study about the evacuation process. Fire and Emergency New Zealand Report 183, June 2021.

== Honours ==
Nilsson received Lund University's "Teacher of the Year" award in Fire-safety Engineering in 2015 and 2018. In 2017, he was awarded the BIV-stipendiet by BIV, the Swedish chapter of the Society of Fire Protection Engineers, which cited his research on human behaviour in fire, his willingness to share knowledge with students and practising engineers, and his work to raise international awareness of Swedish fire engineering through ISO/TC 92/SC 4.
