= Margaret McNamee =

Australian–Swedish professor of fire-safety engineering

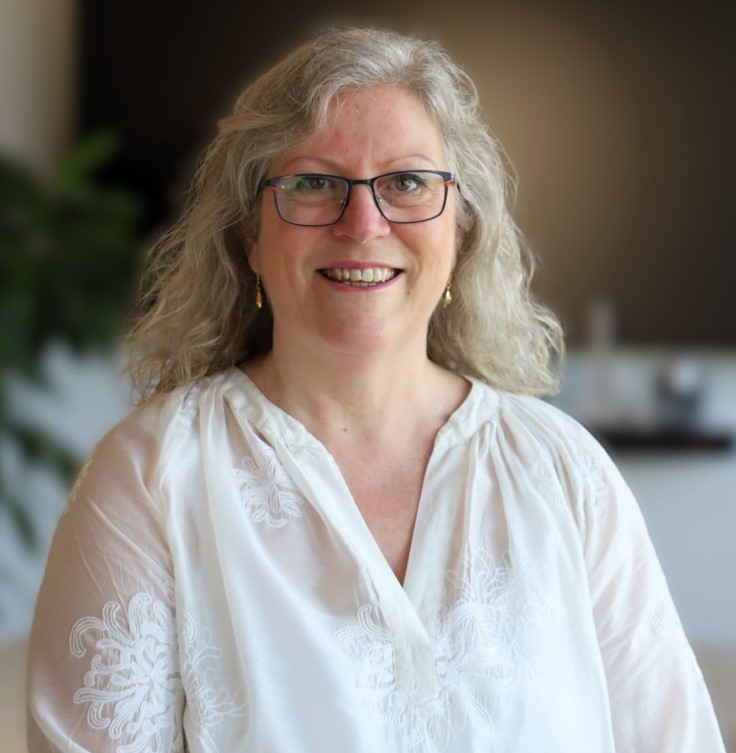
- Born: September 19, 1965 (age 60); Australia
- Citizenship: Australia; Sweden
- Education: University of Sydney (BSc); Chalmers University of Technology (Lic); University of Gothenburg (PhD)
- Known for: Research on the environmental impact of fires and sustainable fire-resilient construction
- Awards: Sjölin Award (2023); Dougal Drysdale Award (2023); Arthur B. Guise Medal (2024)
- Scientific career
- Fields: Fire-safety engineering, combustion chemistry, sustainability
- Workplaces: Lund University; RISE Research Institutes of Sweden; SP Technical Research Institute of Sweden
- Thesis: Some Experimental and Theoretical Aspects of Combustion Chemistry (1995)
- Doctoral advisor: Sture Nordholm

Margaret Mary Simonson McNamee (born 19 September 1965) is an Australian-Swedish fire-safety engineer. She is Professor of Fire Safety Engineering and, since 2024, Deputy Dean of the Faculty of Engineering (LTH) at Lund University in Sweden. Her research addresses smoke toxicity, fire-generated pollutants and the integration of sustainability into fire-safety practice.

== Early life and education ==
McNamee was born in Australia in 1965. She earned a Bachelor of Science in general science from the University of Sydney in 1986, a licentiate in physical chemistry from Chalmers University of Technology in 1991 and a PhD in physical chemistry from the University of Gothenburg in 1995 with the thesis Some Experimental and Theoretical Aspects of Combustion Chemistry.

== Career ==
After completing her doctorate, McNamee joined the Swedish National Testing and Research Institute (later the SP Technical Research Institute of Sweden) as a researcher in 1995. She held numerous leadership roles in the Department of Fire Research and, in 2014, was appointed Chief Technology Officer first for SP and later for RISE Research Institutes of Sweden when SP merged with several other institutes across Sweden in 2016.

McNamee founded McNamee Consulting in 2018 and that same year joined Lund University as Professor of Fire Safety Engineering. She became Deputy Dean of the Faculty of Engineering in 2024.

== Research ==
McNamee’s work focuses on quantifying the environmental consequences of unwanted fires, assessing smoke toxicity and developing life-cycle-based methods for sustainable, fire-resilient design. She has also contributed to international agendas for wildfire risk reduction and to cost–benefit analyses of flame-retardant use in buildings.

== Awards and honours ==
- Sjölin Award (2023) – International FORUM of Fire Research Directors, for outstanding achievements in fire-safety science.
- Dougal Drysdale Award (2023) – International Association for Fire Safety Science, recognising extraordinary service to the organisation.
- Arthur B. Guise Medal (2024) – Society of Fire Protection Engineers, its highest research honour.

== Selected works ==
- Zhu, N.; Tang, F.; Peng, X.; Sun, X.; Hu, L.; **McNamee, M. S.** (2025). “Experimental study on thermal runaway evolution and toxicity hazard of lithium-ion batteries in a tunnel under longitudinal air flow.” Journal of Energy Storage 114: 115651. doi:10.1016/j.est.2025.115651
- McNamee, M. S. et al. (2019). “IAFSS Agenda 2030 for a Fire Safe World.” Fire Safety Journal 110: 102889. doi:10.1016/j.firesaf.2019.102889
- Simonson McNamee, M.; Andersson, P. (2014). “Application of a cost–benefit analysis model to the use of flame retardants.” Fire Technology 51: 67–83. doi:10.1007/s10694-014-0402-9
