= Wojciech Wegrzyński =

Polish fire-safety engineer

Wojciech Węgrzyński
- Born: December 7, 1985 (age 40)
- Citizenship: Poland
- Education: Łódź University of Technology (D.Sc., 2020); Ph.D. Civil Engineering (2017) – institution TBD
- Known for: Host of the Fire Science Show podcast; research on wind–fire coupling & smoke-control optimisation
- Awards: NFPA Harry C. Bigglestone Award (2019); SFPE 5 Under 35 (2020); SFPE European Fire Safety Engineering Award (2025)
- Scientific career
- Fields: Fire safety engineering; smoke & heat control; CFD
- Workplaces: Building Research Institute (ITB), Warsaw
- Thesis: The influence of partitions in buildings on the flow of smoke in case of fire (2017)

Wojciech Węgrzyński (born December 7, 1985) is a Polish fire-safety engineer and Professor of the Building Research Institute (ITB) in Warsaw, where he serves as Deputy Head of the Fire Research Department. He is internationally recognised for his work on smoke-control systems, coupled wind–fire modelling, and communication of fire-science research through his podcast Fire Science Show.

== Education ==
Węgrzyński first completed a post-graduate diploma in Building Safety at the Main School of Fire Service in Warsaw (2008–2009). He then earned a Ph.D. in Civil Engineering (specialization in Fire Safety Engineering) in 2017, producing a thesis titled The influence of partitions in buildings on the flow of smoke in case of fire. In 2020 he attained a D.Sc. (habilitacja) in Technical Sciences from Łódź University of Technology with the monograph Limiting the consequences of a fire in a building through exhaust of heat and smoke.

== Career ==
Węgrzyński joined ITB's Fire Research Department in 2010 and progressed from engineering specialist to Professor of ITB (2020). Since 2018, he has been Deputy Head of the department, overseeing one of Europe's largest fire-testing laboratories and leading more than 200 smoke-protection consultancies for shopping centres, road and rail tunnels, and high-rise buildings. He supervises five doctoral projects on AI-enhanced tunnel automation, e-mobility fire hazards, holistic car-park safety, low-pressure water systems, and visibility in smoke (jointly with Hong Kong PolyU).

== Podcasts ==
Since 2021 Węgrzyński has hosted the weekly Fire Science Show podcast (200 + episodes), connecting researchers and practitioners worldwide.

== Awards ==
- 2025 — SFPE European Fire Safety Engineering Award.
- 2020 — SFPE 5 Under 35 Award.
- 2019 — NFPA Harry C. Bigglestone Award for two-part review on wind–fire coupled modelling.
- 2020 — Jack Watts Award for Outstanding Reviewer, Fire Technology.

== Selected works ==
- Węgrzyński W.; Vigne G. "Experimental and numerical evaluation of the influence of soot yield on visibility in smoke," Fire Safety Journal 91 (2017).
- Węgrzyński W.; Lipecki T. "Wind and Fire Coupled Modelling — Part I: Literature Review," Fire Technology 54 (2018).
- Węgrzyński W. et al. "Operational uptime and other measures of performance of an open car park in fire," Fire Safety Journal 148 (2024).
