= National Safety Council =

American nonprofit public service organization

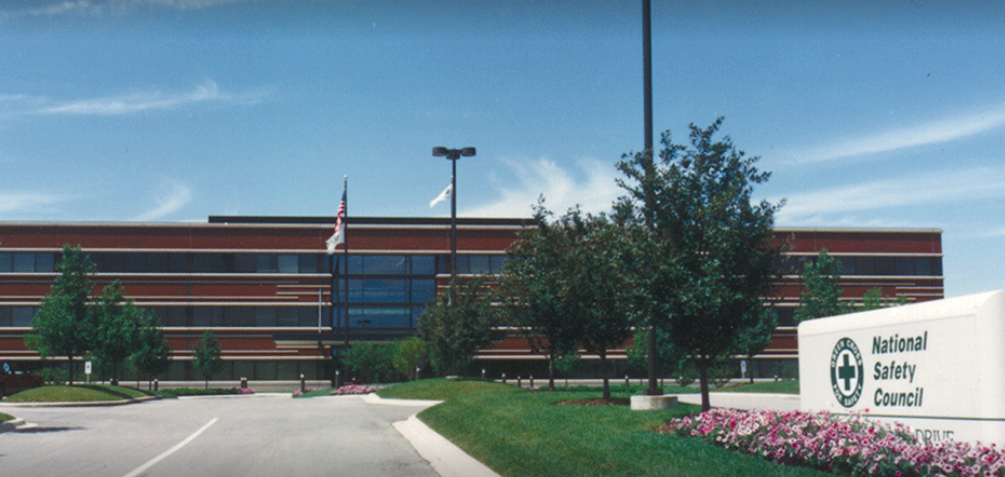
- The National Safety Council is based in Itasca, Illinois.
- Founded: 1913; Chartered by Congress in 1953
- Type: 501(c)(3) nonprofit organization
- Location: Itasca, Illinois
- Field: Workplace safety, transportation safety, home and community safety
- Key people: Lorraine M. Martin, CEO; Anas Al-Hamwi, chairman
- Website: www.nsc.org

The National Safety Council (NSC) is a 501(c)(3) nonprofit, public service organization promoting health and safety in the United States. Headquartered in Itasca, Illinois, NSC is a member organization, founded in 1913 and granted a congressional charter in 1953. Members include more than 55,000 businesses, labor organizations, schools, public agencies, private groups and individuals.

The group focuses on areas where the greatest number of preventable injuries and deaths occur, including workplace safety, prescription medication abuse, teen driving, cell phone use while driving and safety in homes and communities.

== History ==
Following the March 25, 1911 Triangle Shirtwaist Factory Fire in New York City, the Association of Iron and Steel Electrical Engineers (a predecessor of the Association for Iron and Steel Technology) called for a national industrial safety conference. In 1912, the Association of Iron and Steel Electrical Engineers sponsored the first Cooperative Safety Congress, which took place in Milwaukee, Wisconsin. The approximately 200 attendees, representing industry and government, resolved to “organize and create a permanent body for the promotion of the safety to human life in the industries of the United States."

In 1913, at the Second Safety Congress in New York City, the National Council for Industrial Safety was established. It was headquartered in Chicago, Illinois and Robert W. Campbell served as first president and William H. Cameron served as secretary. The name was changed to National Safety Council in 1914, to reflect the organization's expanded scope to include traffic and home safety. As membership increased, the NSC began producing posters, technical fact sheets, and other publications. In 1953, the U.S. Congress and President Dwight D. Eisenhower recognized the importance of the NSC’s efforts with a Congressional charter to: “...arouse and maintain the interest of the people of the United States... in safety and in accident prevention, and to encourage the adoption and institution of safety methods by all persons, corporations, and other organizations."

== Services ==
- Traffic safety: Motor vehicle crashes are the number one cause of unintentional injury deaths in the United States. NSC works with public and private groups to help reduce the number of deaths and injuries on the road.
- Defensive driving: the National Safety Council has offered defensive driving courses since 1964 with the first approved courses in New Jersey and New York.
- First aid: NSC offers first aid training courses for safety, compliance and wellness. Classroom programs are available, as well as online training. The group is a member of the Department of Homeland Security’s Citizen Corps, a network of organizations and individuals dedicated to raising awareness about the need for preparedness. Since the NSC's Emergency Care Services program began in 1991, more than 8 million rescuers have been trained in the program.
- Fleet safety: the NSC and partner groups have hosted various symposia to bring attention to the number of fleet driver fatalities that occur, and to develop strategies for protecting workers while on the road.
- Teen driving: NSC strategy aims to reduce teen driving motor vehicle fatalities through education about graduated driver licensing (GDL), an education process proven to reduce teen driving fatalities by 20 to 40 percent by gradually exposing teen drivers to higher crash risk situations. GDL puts restrictions on high crash risk factors such as passengers and nighttime driving.
- Workplace safety: NSC works with the U.S. Occupational Safety and Health Administration (OSHA) and the U.S. Department of Labor, to strengthen workplace safety and help reduce the number of unintentional injuries and fatalities.
- Training: NSC offers training courses based on best practices for occupational safety and health, driver improvement and emergency care.
- Off-the-job: NSC and multi-national corporate leaders and federal safety experts establish the first symposium on off-the-job safety in the U.S., to help reduce injury-related fatalities that occur off-the-job.
- Elder falls: falls are the leading cause of injury-related deaths among older adults. The NSC is part of the Falls Free Coalition, which hopes to advance a national action plan to build community awareness and support for fall prevention activities among older adults.
- Safe Communities America: NSC is an affiliate of the World Health Organization’s Safe Communities program, and operates a support center and a Safe Communities Certifying Center for the United States. Communities apply for the Safe Communities designation by indicating their long-term commitment to the promotion of safety.

== Organization ==
NSC is governed by a Board of Directors and a board of delegates. The board of directors manages fiduciary and strategic affairs. The Board of Delegates developsc the mission agenda, creates public policies, and tracks safety, health and environmental trends. More than 2,000 volunteers, drawn from NSC industry volunteer divisions, assist the boards in determining policies, operating procedures and programs to be developed and implemented by the council's professional staff.

The National Safety Council's network of 21 local chapters conducts safety, health and environmental efforts at the community level, providing training, conferences, workshops, consultation, newsletters, updates and safety support materials, as well as networking avenues.

Members of NSC are segmented into Divisions, also known as special interest groups. Division members plan and create programs for the annual NSC Congress & Expo, and participate in discussions of research findings, new concepts, trends, and ideas for safety challenges. Divisions meet twice a year. The divisions are Business & Industry, Construction, Highway Traffic Safety, Labor, Motor Transportation, and Utilities. Some divisions are further segmented into sections.

=== NSC Congress and Expo ===
Held each fall, the NSC Congress & Expo attracts 15,000 safety and health professionals, plus industry suppliers from several countries. The event promotes safety and health products and services, and new safety technologies and training methods. Members attending the annual Congress can also earn continuing education credits by participating in technical sessions and professional development seminars.

== National Safety Month ==
In 1996 NSC established June as National Safety Month, aiming to increase awareness of the leading safety and health risks and ultimately decrease the number of unintentional injuries and deaths. Each week focuses on a specific safety venue: workplace, traffic, home, and community.

== See also ==
- Department of Public Safety
- National Child Passenger Safety Board
- Robert W. Campbell Award
