= Albert Simeoni =

French specialist in wildland-fire science

- Education: University of Corsica (BSc 1994; PhD 2000); Polytech Marseille (MEng 1996)
- Known for: Experimental and numerical modelling of wildland and wildland-urban-interface fires
- Awards: Arthur B. Guise Medal (2022)
- Scientific career
- Fields: Fire safety science; wildland-fire dynamics
- Workplaces: University of Corsica (2000–2013); University of Edinburgh (2013–2015); Worcester Polytechnic Institute (2017–present)

Albert Simeoni is a French and American fire-safety engineer and academic whose research explores the behaviour of wildland and wildland–urban interface fires. He is professor and head of the Department of Fire Protection Engineering at Worcester Polytechnic Institute in Massachusetts, United States.

== Early life and education ==
Simeoni read physics at the University of Corsica, graduating with a Licence (BSc) in 1994. He completed an MEng in thermal transfers at Polytech Marseille in 1996 before returning to Corsica for doctoral work. His PhD thesis (2000) developed multiphase models to improve predictions of forest-fire spread.

== Career ==
After earning his doctorate, Simeoni was appointed maître de conférences (assistant professor) at the University of Corsica, where he led a CNRS-affiliated research group on forest-fire modelling.

In 2013, he moved to the United Kingdom to take up the BRE Chair of Fire Safety Engineering at the University of Edinburgh, a post he held until 2015. Simeoni joined WPI in 2017 and became department head the same year. Beyond the university sector, he serves as treasurer (board member since 2014) of the International Association of Wildland Fire (IAWF).

Simeoni’s work combines laboratory and field experiments with computational fluid-dynamics models to examine flame spread, firebrand generation and coupled fire–atmosphere interactions. His recent projects include establishing a National Science Foundation Wildfire Interdisciplinary Research Center at WPI, and developing physics-based tools for assessing extreme fire behaviour.

== Honours ==
- Arthur B. Guise Medal of the Society of Fire Protection Engineers (2022), recognising his "eminent achievement in connecting wildland-fire science with fire-protection practice"

== Selected publications ==
- Santoni, P.A.; Simeoni, A.; et al. “Instrumentation of wildland fire: characterisation of a fire spreading through a Mediterranean shrub”, Fire Safety Journal 41 (3): 171–184 (2006).
- Thomas, J.C.; Simeoni, A.; et al. “Investigation of firebrand generation from an experimental fire: development of a reliable data-collection methodology”, Fire Safety Journal 91 : 864–871 (2017).
- Mueller, E.; Mell, W.; Simeoni, A. “Large-eddy simulation of forest-canopy flow for wildland-fire modelling”, Canadian Journal of Forest Research 44 (12): 1534–1544 (2014).
