= Japan Microgravity Centre =

Japanese research facility (?-2003)

Coordinates: 43°28′39″N 141°59′36″E

Japan Microgravity Centre (JAMIC) is a site for microgravity experiments at a 710-metre-deep abandoned coal mine at Kamisunagawa, Hokkaido. A capsule is dropped from the top to simulate "zero gravity". Jets accelerate the capsule to counteract air resistance. At the bottom, the capsule is slowed with gradual deceleration. Cushioning exists at the bottom for emergencies.

This facility was closed in spring 2003.
