= Institution of Fire Engineers =

International professional body

- Abbreviation: IFE
- Formation: 31 October 1918
- Type: Professional membership body
- Headquarters: Stratford-upon-Avon, UK
- Region served: Worldwide
- Services: Professional membership, qualifications, training, events
- Members: Over 10,000 (February 2022)
- Website: ife.org.uk

The Institution of Fire Engineers (IFE) is a global professional membership body for those in the fire sector that seek to increase their knowledge, professional recognition and understanding of fire through a global discourse.

== Membership and professional registration ==
The IFE has over 10,000 members around the world.

IFE members represent the whole spectrum of the fire sector and are involved in the study of fire dynamics, consultations with governments on fire safety legislation and regulations, structural fire protection, fire insurance and arson investigation, behaviour pattern of persons faced with emergencies, fire detection and alarm systems, fire appliances and automatic fire fighting systems.

Alongside providing its own membership grades, the IFE is a Professional Engineering Institution (PEI) and has been a licensed member of the Engineering Council since 2007. This allows the IFE to register those members that meet the necessary criteria as Chartered Engineers (CEng), Incorporated Engineers (IEng) or Engineering Technicians (EngTech). If individuals have recently graduated and want recognition of their qualifications while they build their experience as a fire engineer, they could become an Interim registrant with the IFE.

A number of professional panels, committees and technical working groups underpin the work of the IFE. IFE Special Interest Groups (SIGS) act as a forum for exchanging ideas and raising standards. They cover a variety of topics, including Fire Modelling, Heritage Buildings, Transport, Fire Investigation and Rescue Engineering.

== Membership grades and post-nominals ==
The IFE has different membership types to suit anyone interested in, studying or working in fire engineering, with graded memberships designed to recognise fire sector professionals at different stages of their career:

Affiliate Individual (no post-nominal) – Affiliate Individual membership is available to anyone with an interest in fire engineering but that have not met the requirements of a membership grade.

Student (no post-nominal) – The Student membership is available for free for students that are currently studying fire engineering. Student members receive all the normal benefits of being and IFE member, but without the cost. Student membership is limited to a maximum of five years.

Technician (TIFireE) – The Technician grade membership is for those who have at least two years of experience in the fire sector and meet the academic and other requirements.

Graduate (GIFireE) – The Graduate grade membership of the Institution of Fire Engineers is for professionals who meet the academic requirements and have a minimum of three years of experience specifically in fire engineering.

Associate (AIFireE) – The Associate grade membership is for those who meet the academic criteria for Member grade but lack sufficient experience required to fully meet all the Member grade criteria. The lack of experience requirement makes Associate membership a good fit for new graduates of fire-related degrees.

Member (MIFireE) – The Member grade membership is recommended for individuals who have a Level 4 Diploma or equivalent and have at least five years of experience working in the fire sector.

Fellow (FIFireE) – The grade of Fellow can only be applied for by existing Member grade IFE members. Fellow grade membership is only awarded to longstanding members of the IFE who's contributions to it and fire engineering in general are deemed exceptional by the IFE.

Technical Report Route – The purpose of the Technical Report Route is to provide a route to membership for the grades of Graduate (GIFireE) and Member (MIFireE). This route is available for those persons who do not have academic qualifications required for membership of the IFE, but who are able to demonstrate that in later life, they have achieved a standard of professional competence comparable to their contemporaries who have achieved their grade of membership through the academic route.

Affiliate Organisation – Affiliate Organisation membership is available to any company that might have an interest in fire engineering and would like to be affiliated with the IFE.

== Qualifications ==
The IFE's qualifications are recognised by employers in the fire sector throughout the UK and internationally. They are recognised and regulated by the Office of Qualifications and Examinations Regulation (Ofqual).

Each year the IFE receives around 6,000 examination entries from candidates in more than 20 different countries. IFE examinations take place twice a year, in March and October.

Assessments are available in specialist fire subject areas such as fire engineering science, fire safety, fire service operations and incident command, fire investigation and passive fire protection. The assessment materials are developed and quality assured by sector experts who bring extensive experience and up to date knowledge to the assessment process.

The IFE also has qualifications that have been developed in partnership with the Association for Specialist Fire Protection (ASFP). These are specialist qualifications in passive fire protection.

== Fire risk registers ==
The IFE manages a Register of Fire Risk Assessors and Auditors and was the first UK organisation to establish a register of its kind. All successful applicants must demonstrate to a Professional Review Panel that they have suitable education, training, and experience in the principles of fire safety and fire risk assessment, and this involves submitting examples of their work for evaluation.

In 2022, the IFE introduce the mandatory requirement for individuals on the register to be dual registered with the Engineering Council via the IFE. This change was a result of recommendations made in the Setting the Bar report.

The IFE is also a member of the Fire Risk Assessment Competency Council which has published national competency criteria with which all applicants to schemes are expected to be familiar.

== Branches ==
The IFE has 19 Branches in the United Kingdom and 22 International Branches which members can be a part of. IFE Branches are run by volunteers and provide members with access to a local network of fire professionals, CPD events and updates on local developments.

Each IFE Branch is represented in the International General Assembly (IGA) which meets twice each year to proactively share learnings and to provide an important link between overseas members, the Board of Trustees and IFE Head Office staff.

== Board of trustees ==
Board trustees work in a voluntary capacity and are appointed for a term of three years.

The Board retains responsibility for the approval of matters that affect the shape and risk profile of the Institution as well as such items as the annual budget and performance targets, the published accounts and investment policy.

== Origin and history ==
On 31 October 1918, ten Chief Officers attended a meeting at the Fire Brigade Headquarters in Leicester to set up a professional organisation for fire engineers. The next meeting took place on 2 January 1919, in London, when it was announced that 40 Chief Officers had agreed to become members, including three from overseas. The first Memorandum, Articles of Association and By-Laws were approved, and initial membership fees were fixed.

On 12 February 1924, members agreed to proceed with office incorporation. The first registered office was established in Edinburgh Scotland and has been ever since. The first steps were also taken to set up an examination scheme.

In 1933, the Institution's first publication, 'Chemical Fires', was released. After several editions and revisions, it was withdrawn in the early 1970s. Following this in 1934, the IFE Head Office was moved to London and membership figures stood at 599. The Head Office then 'returned home' to Leicester in 1965.

In 1971, Margaret Law became the first woman to become a member of the IFE.

The IFE was then accorded 'Charitable Status' in 1980 and became a licensed body of the Engineering Council in 1998.

The IFE Head Office was relocated to the Fire Service College at Moreton in Marsh in 2004.

2010 saw the IFE be approved as an Awarding Body by the Office of the Qualifications and Examinations Regulator (Ofqual). This enabled the IFE to develop general and vocational related qualifications for the Fire Sector. Two years later in 2012, the IFE published the first issue of its own journal – International Fire Professional.

In 2016 the IFE purchased the Stratford upon Avon office which it had rented since 2011. The mayor of Stratford upon Avon, Councillor Juliet Short, formally opened the office.

2018 saw the IFE celebrate its centenary year with a global centenary torch relay and programme of international events. The centenary year was launched in its birthplace of Leicester, where a plaque was unveiled by Sir Peter Soulsby, the mayor of Leicester City. The IFE also launched its Firefighter Safety Database.

In 2020 the IFE appointed Peter Wilkinson as the first Technical Director of the Institution. This new role was designed to provide better technical support to members. Following this, in 2021, the IFE worked with Collaborative Reporting for Safer Structures UK to expand its remit to include fire safety. This enabled individuals to share their concerns about, and experiences of, fire and structural safety through a confidential safety reporting system.

The IFE undertook a comprehensive review of its communications and activities in 2021 to improve its services and qualifications for members and strengthen its global influence in the two key areas of competence and sustainability.
