= Fire Safety Journal =

- Discipline: Engineering
- Language: English
- Edited by: Luke Bisby, Bart Merci

Publication details
- History: 1977–present
- Publisher: Elsevier
- Frequency: 8/year
- Open access: Hybrid
- Impact factor: 3.3 (2024)

Standard abbreviations
- ISO 4: Fire Saf. J.

Indexing
- CODEN: FSJODZ
- ISSN: 0379-7112
- LCCN: 80649789
- OCLC no.: 564527253

Links
- Journal homepage; Online archive

Fire Safety Journal is a peer-reviewed scientific journal covering research on all aspects of the science and engineering of fire, fire safety, and fire protection. Topics include but are not limited to chemistry and physics of fire, fire dynamics, explosions, fire protection systems, detection, suppression, structural response, structural protection, fire investigations, design (including consumer products, industrial plant, transportation, buildings), people/fire interactions (physical, physiological, and psychological), risk, management, legislation, and education. It is the official journal of the International Association for Fire Safety Science and is published by Elsevier.

The editors-in-chief are Luke Bisby (University of Edinburgh) and Bart Merci (Ghent University).

== Abstracting and indexing ==
The journal is abstracted and indexed in:

- Chemical Abstracts Service
- Current Contents/Engineering, Computing & Technology
- EBSCO databases
- Ei Compendex
- Inspec
- Science Citation Index Expanded
- Scopus

According to the Journal Citation Reports, the journal has a 2024 impact factor of 3.3.
