= International Association for Fire Safety Science =

International non-profit association

- Abbreviation: IAFSS
- Formation: 1985; 41 years ago
- Type: Charitable organization
- Purpose: Promoting Research
- Members: 400+
- Official language: English
- Chairman: Prof Naian Liu, University of Science and Technology of China
- Main organ: Committee
- Website: www.iafss.org

The International Association for Fire Safety Science (IAFSS) is an institution founded with the primary objective of encouraging research into the science of preventing and mitigating the adverse effects of fires and of providing a forum for presenting the results of such research. It is legally established as a charitable organization in England and Wales with number 800306. Since 2013, the IAFSS chair is Prof Naian Liu (University of Science and Technology of China), who has replace Dr Brian Meacham (USA).

The official research journal of the association is Fire Safety Journal, published by Elsevier.

The association engages in other learned activities to the benefit of the fire science and engineering community and operates an open mailing list by which people participate in on-line discussions.

== Mission ==
The International Association for Fire Safety Science perceives its role to lie in the scientific bases for achieving progress in unsolved fire problems. It will seek cooperation with other organizations, be they concerned with application or with the sciences that are fundamental to our interests in fire. It will seek to promote high standards, to encourage and stimulate scientists to address fire problems, to provide the necessary scientific foundations and means to facilitate applications aimed at reducing life and property loss.

Since its inaugural meeting in, the IAFSS has grown to more than four hundred members. Current members come from Australia, Austria, Belgium, Brazil, Canada, China, Denmark, Germany, Finland, France, the Netherlands, Hong Kong, India, Ireland, Italy, Japan, Korea, Luxembourg, New Zealand, Norway, Russia, Spain, Sweden, Switzerland, Taiwan, United Kingdom and United States of America.

Currently, Interscience Communications acts as the Secretariat for the association.

== Symposia ==
The IAFSS holds triennial symposia. The first one took place in 1986 in Berkeley, California and the last one in 2026 took place in La Rochelle(France). All papers in the proceedings have been peer reviewed through a rigorous review procedure. IAFSS symposia are very competitive with only about 1/3 of the submitted papers being accepted for publication. The selected papers for 2023 were published in special issue in Fire Safety Journal.

The IAFSS bibliographic database offers access to the complete citation information and abstracts for all the full papers in the Proceedings of the International Symposiums, Proceedings of the Asia-Oceania Association for Fire Science and Technology, and the Fire Research Notes from former Fire Research Station (now BRE).
