= Society of Fire Protection Engineers =

Professional society for fire protection engineering

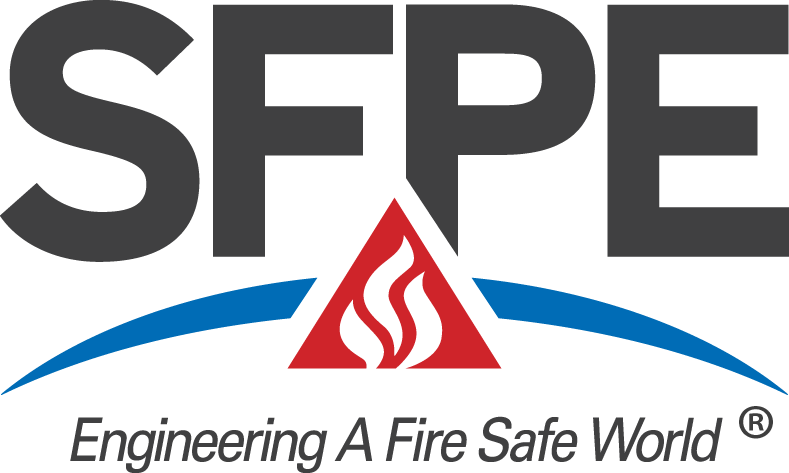
- Industry: Fire Protection Engineering
- Headquarters: Gaithersburg, Maryland, United States
- Area served: Worldwide
- Key people: Bob Libby (President); Chris Jelenewicz(CEO)
- Website: www.sfpe.org/home

The Society of Fire Protection Engineers (SFPE) is a professional society for fire protection engineering established in 1950 and incorporated as an independent organization in 1971. It is the professional society representing those practicing the field of fire protection engineering. The Society has over 5,000 members and more than 120 chapters and over 20 student chapters worldwide. SFPE also includes the SFPE foundation with the following mission "Enhancing the scientific understanding of fire and its interaction with the social, natural and built environments".

SFPE and NFPA publish the Fire Technology Journal through Springer, and Fire Protection Engineering magazine is published quarterly by SFPE.

The current CEO is Chris Jelenewicz while the SFPE President is Bob Libby.

== Conferences ==
SFPE hosts an Annual Conference & Expo, which attracts over 400 professionals from around the globe including experts from the U.S., Canada, Europe, South America, Asia, Africa, Middle East, and the Oceanic. Each year, SFPE hosts the Europe Conference on Fire Safety Engineering or International Performance-Based Design Codes and Fire Safety Design Methods Conference.

== Codes and standards ==
The association's codes and standards include:

- SFPE Standard on Calculating Fire Exposures to Structures
- SFPE Standard on Calculation Methods to Predict the Thermal Performance of Structural and Fire Resistive Assemblies

== Handbooks ==
The SFPE produces a reference publication known as the SFPE Handbook of Fire Protection Engineering. The most recent edition, representing the 6th edition of the publication, was published in 2026 by Springer Nature.

== Engineering guides ==
SFPE have released several guidelines in the last 25 years:

- Guide to Human Behavior in Fire, 2nd edition
- Engineering Guide: Fire Safety for Very Tall Buildings
- Guide for Substantiating a Fire Model for a Given Application
- Guide for Peer Review in the Fire Protection Design Process
- Performance-Based Fire Protection, 2nd Edition
- Predicting Room of Origin Fire Hazards (Archived)
- Guide for Fire Risk Assessment
- Code Officials Guide to Performance-Based Design Review
- Piloted Ignition of Solid Materials Under Radiant Exposure
- Evaluation of the Computer Fire Model DETACT-QS
- Engineering Guide to Predicting 1st and 2nd Degree Skin Burn
- Engineering Guide to Assessing Flame Radiation to External Targets from Liquid Pool Fires

== SFPE awards ==
SFPE recognize excellence in Fire Protection Engineering through different awards:

- SFPE Lund Award for Professional Recognition
- SFPE Lucht Award for Contributions to Education
- SFPE Nelson Award for Inspired Service
- SFPE Ahern President's Award
- SFPE Bryan Mentoring Award
- SFPE Jensen Award for Committee Service
- SFPE Fire Protection Person of the Year Award
- SFPE Spotlight Award
- SFPE Trailblazer Award
- SFPE Award for Chapter Excellence
- SFPE 5 Under 35 Award
