= Oklahoma State University School of Fire Protection and Safety =

Oklahoma State University-Stillwater
- Established: 1937
- Program Coordinator: Virginia Charter
- Administrative staff: 9
- Students: 500+
- Location: Stillwater, Oklahoma, USA
- Website: https://ceat.okstate.edu/det/fpset/

The School of Fire Protection and Safety at Oklahoma State University in Stillwater, Oklahoma has been home to one of the few fire protection programs in North America since its creation in 1937.

The founders of the program saw a need to train personnel in the field of fire protection. Filling that need over the years lead to the creation of: The School of Fire Protection, the publishing of the famous Oklahoma Redbooks and the creation of the International Fire Service Training Association (IFSTA) and Fire Protection Publications (FPP), the establishment of Oklahoma Fire Service Training (FST) and the International Fire Service Accreditation Congress (IFSAC) and the College of Engineering Architecture and Technology (CEAT) outreach extension program.

Together these entities form the fire and safety education program of Oklahoma State University, which has earned the status of, "Standard Quality in the Profession," in 2010 by James Shannon, President of NPFA, along with being dubbed a, "National treasure...its work is of great national importance," by Honorable Adair Wakefield Margo of the President's Committee on the Arts and Humanities.

== History ==
In 1937 the then-named Oklahoma Agricultural and Mechanical College opened the Department of Firemanship Training with a two-year associate degree program. In the late 1940s the curriculum shifted toward industrial fire protection rather than municipal firefighting. In the 1960s the name of the program changed to Fire Protection. In 1973 it became a four-year bachelor's degree program, Fire Protection and Safety Engineering Technology.

== Outreach Programs ==
=== Oklahoma State University Fire Service Training ===
Oklahoma Fire Service Training (OFST) is an extension/outreach unit of Oklahoma State University's College of Engineering, Architecture and Technology (CEAT). OFST has legislative mandate to train Oklahoma's emergency responder's, and provides Oklahoma emergency responders a broad spectrum of training ranging from the basic skills to more advanced specialized topics. This training occurs at the OFST Professional Skills Center located six miles west of Stillwater, Oklahoma and across the state of Oklahoma at any of the nine hundred plus Fire Departments.

OFST's long-standing commitment of service to Oklahoma paid and volunteer firefighters now extends to emergency responders outside of this traditional realm. In January 1997, OFST created the Industrial Section to serve emergency responders in commercial, industrial, institutional, and governmental entities. From Industrial fire brigade fundamentals, to more advanced topics in fire, rescue, incident management, industrial medic, hazardous materials and response to terrorism, OFST takes innovative market-oriented approaches to serve industry's emerging demands for first responder training.

The OFST Certification Section has achieved International Fire Service Accreditation Congress (IFSAC) accreditation in fifteen technical levels. IFSAC accredited certification gives reasonable assurance of the content and quality of the testing program offered by OFST.
