= Smokeproof enclosure =

Type of exit stairwell

In building safety and construction, a smokeproof enclosure is a type of exit stairwell that has been designed to keep out smoke (and other combustion products) in the event of a fire, so that building occupants may more safely exit the building.

== Description ==
Rather than entering the stairwell directly from the building interior, one enters a smokeproof enclosure by means of an open-air balcony or alternatively, a so-called open vestibule, and proceeds thence, to the stairwell itself. The way that the balcony or vestibule is ventilated divides smokeproof enclosures into two basic types: mechanically ventilated which is not actually a smokeproof enclosures, where the vestibule and stairwell are ventilated by mechanical equipment, and naturally ventilated open air smokeproof enclosures where the open balcony or vestibule [or the stairwell] has openings directly to the outside of the building. This is the only type of the original concept of a smokeproof tower (i.e.: smokeproof enclosure).

== US requirements ==
Under United States building codes, the stairwell of a smokeproof enclosure must have walls with a 2-hour fire resistance rating and vestibule doors (if provided) with a 1.5 hour fire resistance rating. The Life Safety Code states that such stairwells be "approved systems with a design pressure difference across the barrier of not less than 0.05 in. water column (12.5 Pa) in sprinkled buildings and 0.10 in. water column (25 Pa) in non-sprinkled buildings". Approved, in the Life Safety Code, means the committee didn't want to 'decide' so, left it up to someone else to decide a particular issue.

In the so-called mechanically ventilated smokeproof enclosures, the stairwell is positively pressurized relative to the rest of the building. This ensures that even when access doors are opened, smoke will not enter the stairwell. Of course, a higher pressure within a stairwell makes it harder to open doors from the building interior to the enclosed vestibules and to the enclosed stairwell. The Life Safety Code requires that the pressure differential across the barrier not be so great as to prevent the door from opening with a force of 30 lbf (133 N) at the door knob or handle. These 'pressurization' problems are, of course, non-existent with naturally ventilated smokeproof enclosures.

The fans and air ducts used to pressurize the stairwell are life-critical systems, and are required to be enclosed in non-combustible, likewise two hour rated, construction. (For fully sprinkled buildings, the required rating is just one hour.) The fans must be connected to an emergency power supply, and capable of both automatic activation by various fire and smoke detectors, and of manual activation by a central command post or by the actuation of a general fire alarm.

== Sources ==
- Allen, James Elmore (2004). Assisted living administration: the knowledge base (2nd ed.). Springer Publishing Company. ISBN 978-0-8261-1516-4.
- Binggeli, Corky (2011). "Structural Systems § Exit Stairs". Building Systems for Interior Designers (2nd ed.). John Wiley and Sons. ISBN 978-1-118-17432-6.
- Burke, Robert A. (2008). Fire protection: systems and response. CRC Press. ISBN 978-1-56670-622-3.
- Bush, Vincent R. (1988). Handbook to the uniform building code: an illustrative commentary. International Conference of Building Officials.
- Clet, Vince H. (1978). Fire-related codes, laws, and ordinances. Glencoe Press fire science series. Glencoe Publishing Co. ISBN 978-0-02-471760-3.
- Fire Inspector: Principles and Practice. Jones & Bartlett Publishers. 2012. ISBN 978-1-4496-5527-3.
- Lathrop, James K., ed. (1993). Life safety code handbook (5th ed.). National Fire Protection Association. ISBN 978-0-87765-379-0.
- Scott, James G. (1997). Architectural building codes: a graphic reference. John Wiley & Sons. ISBN 978-0-471-28655-4.
