= External water spray system =

An external water spray system (EWSS) is a domestic external fire sprinkler system designed to protect homes from bushfires and wildfires. While external spray systems have long been used in fire protection for buildings and facilities, EWSS refers to domestic bushfire/wildfire systems.

== Usage ==
The types of systems vary greatly from a single impact sprinkler placed on a roof, systems installed during construction with sprays on all windows and doors, and small sprays damping gutters. Some are installed using copper piping and sprays while others use common PVC piping.

Usage depends on type of risk and belief of effectiveness. Copper piping is used to withstand high temperatures that may be experienced during a fire front or for higher reliability for in ceiling installations. External PVC piping is used where failure with exposure to high radiant heat is acceptable, as at the time the system is considered have "done its job". This is a matter of personal judgment.

== Issues ==
There is a lack of scientific research regarding EWSS. Other issues that may affect the effectiveness of an EWSS:

- Sprinkler performance in high wind conditions typical in a bushfire
- Home design
  - High vulnerability areas. e.g. decking
  - Garden beds near walls
  - Window sills
  - Large windows (heat radiation)
  - Internal furnishings (e.g. curtains)
- Home location
  - Slope
  - Surrounding vegetation
- If defended by occupiers
- Preparation (if prepared for defense)
- If intended for remote (unattended) defense
- Available water supply
- Ember attack
- Fire front (radiant heat)
- Adjacent building or vegetation fire

== Types ==
- Roof impact sprinkler
- Gutter sprays
- Window spray / deluge

Commercial sprays designed for EWSS are available, but most systems use commonly available irrigation sprinklers/sprays.

== Research ==
External spray systems for buildings are well documented for protection from fires in adjacent buildings. However, up there is little published scientific research on scientific information pertaining to the effectiveness of EWSS under varying wildfire conditions.

== See also ==
- Active fire protection
- Passive fire protection
- Fire protection
- Fire protection engineering
- Architectural engineering
