= Fire suppression system =

Systems to extinguish or control fires

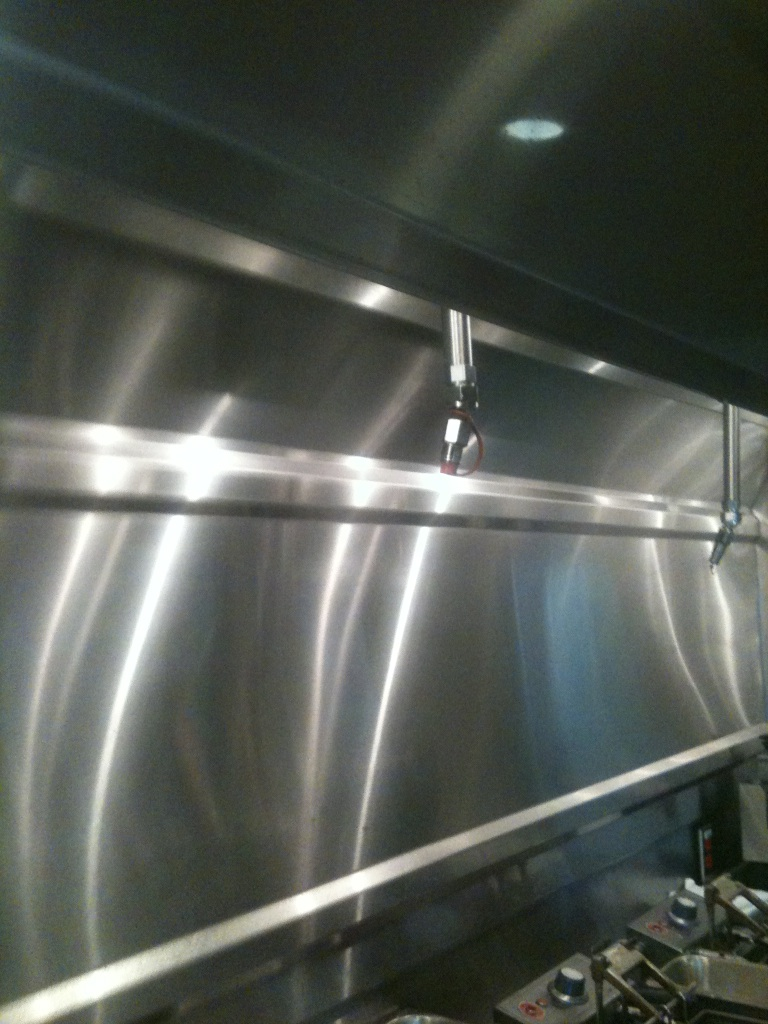
An Ansul fire suppression system in a hospital cafeteria

Fire suppression systems are used to extinguish, control, or in some cases, entirely prevent fires from spreading or occurring. Fire suppression systems have a very large variety of applications, and as such, there are many different types of suppression systems for different applications being used today. Of these, there are some that are still in use but are no longer legal to manufacture and produce, such as Halon 1301.

== Suppression systems ==
Fire suppression systems are governed by the codes under the National Fire Protection Association, also known as the NFPA. This organization writes codes, regulations, and recommendations on the proper installation and maintenance of these fire suppression systems. Likewise, the NFPA also lists criteria that must be met for the requirements of certain types of fire suppression systems.

== Types ==
- Fire sprinkler systems
  - Wet pipes
    - This is the most common sprinkler system. Once the bulb filled with water inside of the pipe heats up, it bursts and allows water to flow freely. If the area where the system is set up cannot be reliably kept above 40 °F (4 °C) then antifreeze will be used.
  - Wet pipe antifreeze
  - Dry pipe
    - These systems are like wet pipe systems; however, they are not constantly filled with water. Instead, when the bulb bursts, air flows and creates a drop in pressure that opens a valve and allows water to flow. These systems are preferable when there is no guarantee of keeping the water from freezing.
  - Pre-action
    - This system is the most complex, with three different types. A noninterlock system where there is either the operation of detection devices or the operation of automatic sprinklers, a single interlock system where there is only the operation of detection devices, and a double interlock system where both detection devices and automatic sprinklers are used.
  - Deluge
    - These systems are like pre-action systems but they differ in that once the detection system is operated water will begin to flow from every sprinkler head.
  - Electronic
  - Water-mist
    - This system is triggered when the water within reaches very high pressure and is then forced through the sprinkler head.
- Gaseous agents
- These systems are best for when water would be detrimental.
  - Heat-absorbing gases
  - Inert gases which displace oxygen
  - Gases which disrupt the chain reaction of combustion
  - Halogenated agents
    - These are agents made up of chemical blends that utilize mainly bromine, chlorine, fluorine, and iodine. The industry standard was once Halon 1301, but once it was revealed how bad for the environment the agent was, manufacturing was stopped.
- Chemical agent systems
  - Wet chemical
  - Dry chemical
- Fully automatic suppression systems
- Fully automatic vehicle fire suppression systems
- Manual vehicle fire suppression systems
- External water spray system
  - These types of systems help reduce the risk of a fire spreading from one building to the next.
- Fire extinguishers
  - Water fire extinguishers are water-based and are best for fires caused by ordinary combustible materials.
  - Film-forming foam fire extinguishers let out a foam instead of liquid or powder and are best suited for fires caused by ordinary combustible materials and flammable liquid fires.
  - Carbon dioxide fire extinguishers do not leave residue and are best for fires caused by flammable liquids and electrical fires.
  - Halogenated fire extinguishers
    - Halon fire extinguishers are similar to carbon dioxide fire extinguishers; however, Halon production has been stalled because of its environmental impact.
    - Halon alternatives clean agent fire extinguishers are similar to halon, but do not have a negative effect on the environment.
  - Dry chemical types
    - Ordinary dry chemical fire extinguishers utilize powdered sodium bicarbonate base and potassium bicarbonate base.
    - Multipurpose dry chemical fire extinguishers have an ammonium phosphate base and adhere to burning materials.
  - Wet chemical fire extinguishers are liquid extinguishers that, when used on ordinary combustible-material fires, work as a coolant, and when used on cooking oil fires forms a foam layer to keep the fire from reigniting.
  - Dry powder fire extinguishers are for fires caused by combustible metals.

== Fire sprinkler systems ==
A fire sprinkler system is an active fire protection method, consisting of a water supply system, providing adequate pressure and flowrate to a water distribution piping system, onto which fire sprinklers are connected. Although historically only used in factories and large commercial buildings, systems for homes and small buildings are now available at a cost-effective price. Fire sprinkler systems are extensively used worldwide, with over 40 million sprinkler heads fitted each year. In buildings completely protected by fire sprinkler systems, over 96% of fires were controlled by fire sprinklers alone.

== See also ==
- National Fire Protection Association
