= Fire protection =

Measures that prevent or mitigate unwanted fire

Fire protection is the study and practice of mitigating the unwanted effects of potentially destructive fires. It involves the study of the behaviour, compartmentalisation, suppression and investigation of fire and its related emergencies, as well as the research and development, production, testing and application of mitigating systems. In structures, be they land-based, offshore or even ships, owners and operators may be responsible for maintaining their facilities in accordance with a design-basis rooted in law, including local building and fire codes.

Buildings must be maintained in accordance with the current fire code, enforced by fire prevention officers of a local fire department. In the event of fire emergencies, Firefighters, fire investigators, and other fire prevention personnel are called to mitigate, investigate and learn from the damage of a fire.

== Classifying fires ==
When deciding on what fire protection is appropriate for any given situation, it is important to assess the types of fire hazards that may be faced. Some jurisdictions operate systems of classifying fires using letter codes.

Fires are sometimes categorized as "one alarm", "two alarm", "three alarm" (or higher) fires. There is no standard definition for what this means, though it always refers to the level of response by local authorities. In some cities the numeric rating refers to the number of fire stations that have been summoned to the fire. In others, the number counts the number of "dispatches" for additional personnel and equipment.

== Components ==
Personnel training and fire training alarm in Karelian Research Centre of RAS, 2018.

Fire protection in land-based buildings, offshore construction or on board ships is typically achieved via all of the following:

- Passive fire protection (PFP) — the installation of firewalls and fire rated floor assemblies to form fire compartments intended to limit the spread of fire, high temperatures, and smoke.
- Active fire protection (AFP) — manual and automatic detection and suppression of fires, such as fire sprinkler systems and (fire alarm) systems.
- Education — the provision of information regarding passive and active fire protection systems to building owners, operators, occupants, and emergency personnel so that they have a working understanding of the intent of these systems and how they perform in the fire safety plan.

== Balanced approach ==
Passive fire protection in the form of compartmentalisation was developed prior to the invention of or widespread use of active fire protection, mainly in the form of automatic fire sprinkler systems. During this time, PFP was the dominant mode of protection provided in facility designs. With the widespread installation of fire sprinklers in the past 50 years, the reliance on PFP as the only approach was reduced.

== Building operation in conformance with design ==
Effective fire protection within a structure relies upon careful and expert design, including compliance with local building and fire codes, by the architect and other building design consultants, and installation in turn being done in compliance with the agreed upon design. Deviations from the original design during installation should be made known to the appropriate authority for review. After installation the system may require testing, and a building permit may then be issued after review by an appropriate authority.

The system may require periodic inspection and testing throughout the lifetime of the structure to identify and repair any faulty components or other defects. Modifications to a structure through its lifetime may require expert consideration of the fire protection system, to ensure that any modifications to the structure do not compromise the safety system.

== Government Guidelines of Fire Protection and Fire Safety ==
- INDIA
- USA
- UAE
- EUROPE
- UK

== See also ==
- Fire prevention
- Automatic fire suppression
- Building code
- Firefighting
- Fire test
- Listing and approval use and compliance
- Passive fire protection
  - Compartmentalization
  - Firestop
  - Intumescent
  - Endothermic
  - Firestop pillow
  - Fire door
  - Fireproofing
  - Fire-resistance rating
- Active fire protection
  - External water spray system
  - Fire sprinkler
  - Fire alarm
  - Fire alarm system
  - Fire alarm control panel
  - Fire detection
  - Fire extinguisher
  - Manual call point
  - Fire sprinkler system
  - Smoke detector
- Hypoxic air fire prevention system
- Gaseous fire suppression
- Condensed aerosol fire suppression
- Fire protection engineering
  - Flame detector
