= PolyU Faculty of Construction and Environment =

Faculty of Construction and Environment, The Hong Kong Polytechnic University
- 香港理工大學建設及環境學院
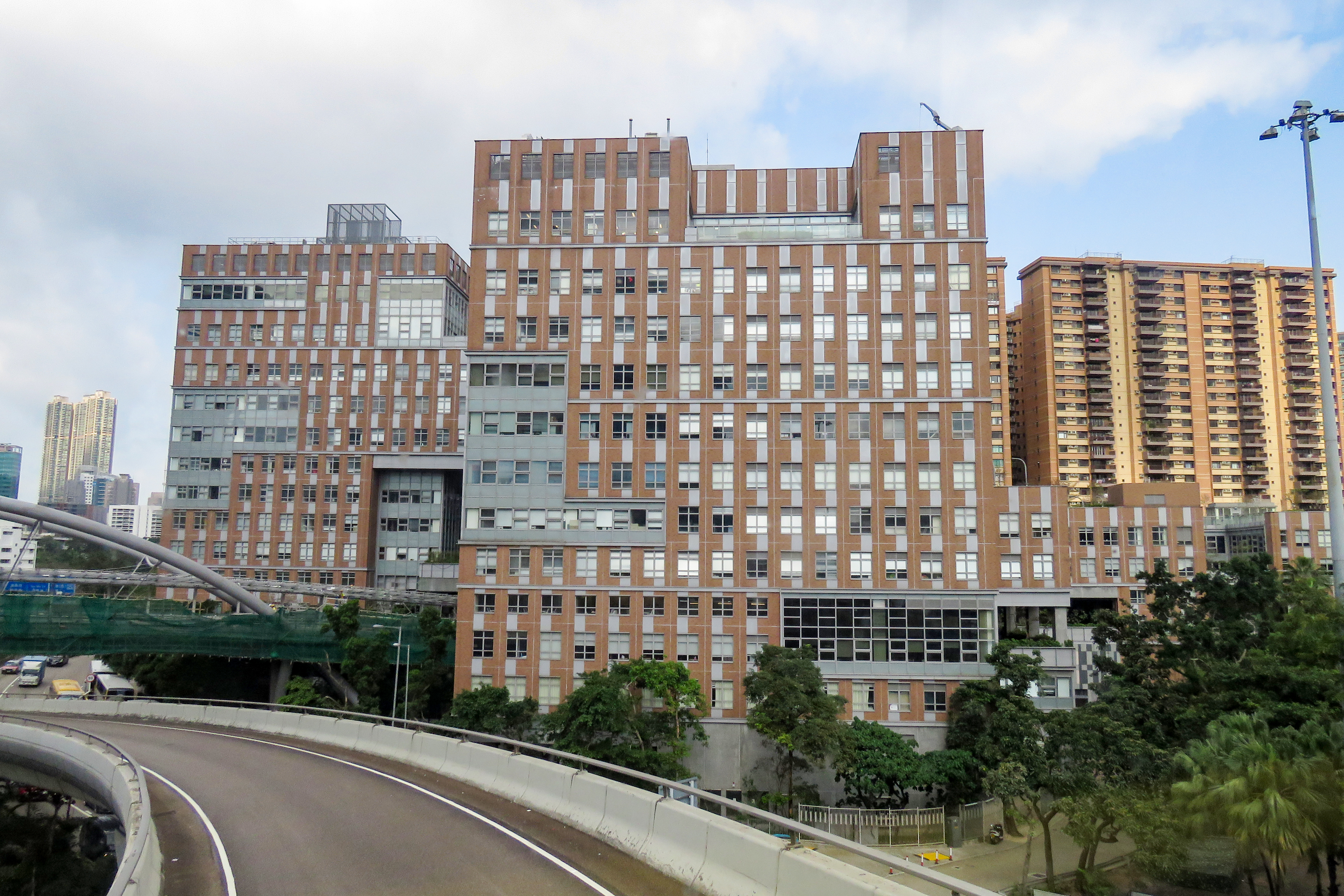
- Motto: Be a leading academic entity on the international scene in the construction, environment, and sustainable urban development fields.
- Type: Public
- Established: 1937
- Dean: Prof. Xiangdong Li
- Academic staff: 115
- Location: Hung Hom, Kowloon, Hong Kong; 22°18′24″N 114°10′45″E
- Website: www.polyu.edu.hk/fce/

The PolyU Faculty of Construction and Environment is one of the faculties at the Hong Kong Polytechnic University. The faculty consists of the Department of Construction Management and Intelligence, Department of Building Environment and Energy Engineering, Department of Civil and Environmental Engineering, and Department of Land Surveying and Geospatial Science. In 2021, the faculty has around 115 full-time academic staff.

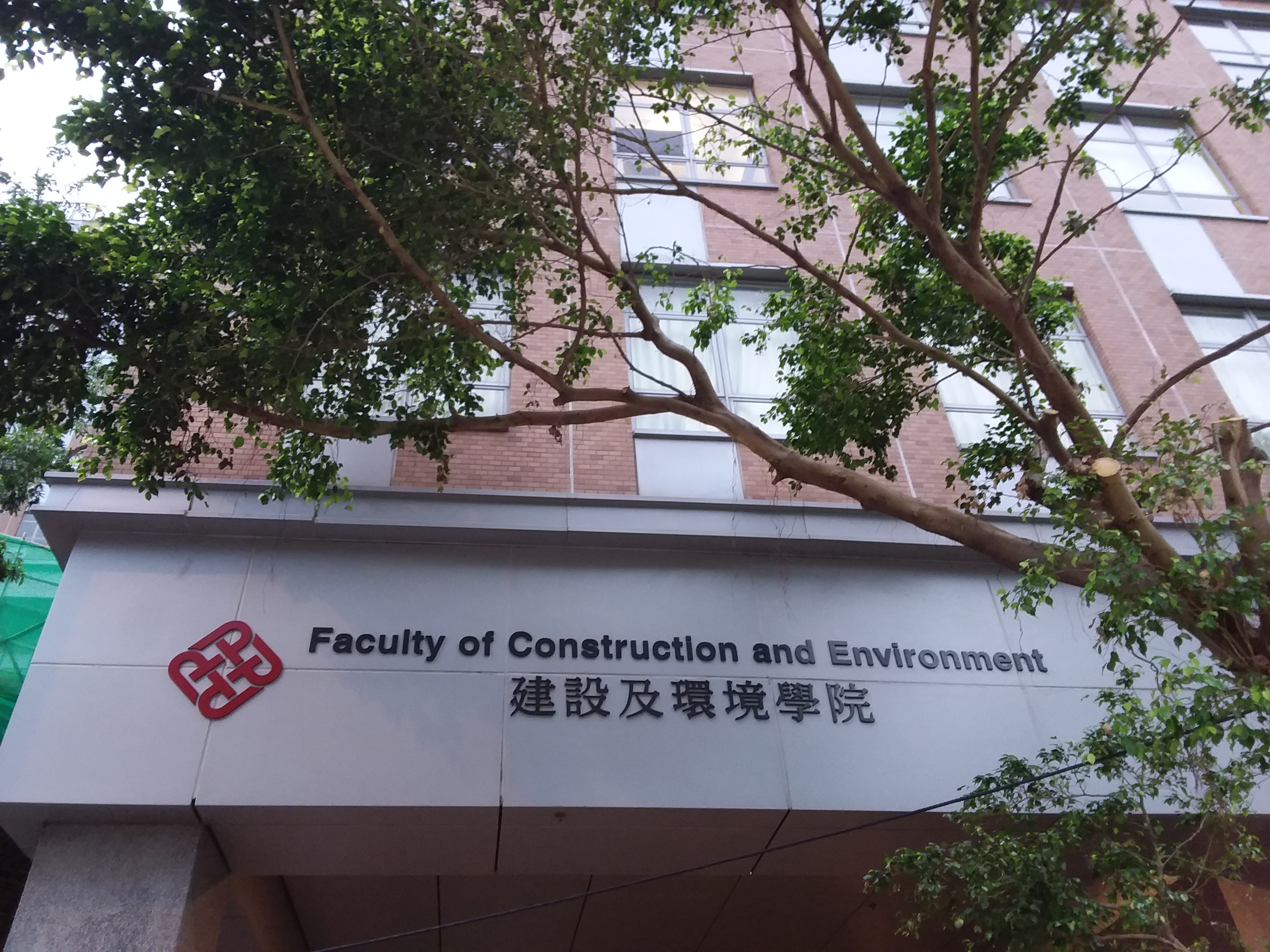
The main entrance of the faculty.

== Overview ==
The history of the Faculty can be date back to 1937. Today's Department of Building and Real Estate within the Faculty is established in 1937 as the Building Department of Government Trade School, Hong Kong. The Faculty has a long history of offering undergraduate and postgraduate programmes in the fields of building engineering, civil engineering, fire engineering, occupational safety and health, structural engineering and surveying.

The Faculty also offers professional training on Surveying and Geo-Information Technology to different government agencies, including Macau Cartography and Cadastre Bureau.

== Research ==
The Faculty involves in research of combining smart city technology to optimise trip planning. Moreover, the Faculty's Ng Wing Hong Laboratory for Sustainable City contributes in research of high-level information technology infrastructure for examining the sustainable development of Hong Kong at the building and city level.
