= K-factor (fire protection) =

Volumetric flow rate calculation for nozzles

In fire protection engineering, the K-factor formula is used to calculate the volumetric flow rate from a nozzle. Spray nozzles can for example be fire sprinklers or water mist nozzles, hose reel nozzles, water monitors and deluge fire system nozzles.

== Calculation ==
K-factors are usually calculated in metric units internationally.

=== Metric units ===
Using metric units, the volumetric flow rate of a nozzle is given by $q = K\sqrt p$, where q is the flow rate in litres per minute ( l/min ), p is the pressure at the nozzle in bar and K is the K-factor is given in units of $(l/min)/\sqrt\text{bar}$.

=== US customary units ===
K-Factors have also previously been calculated and published using the United States customary units of pound per square inch (psi) and gallon per minute (gpm). Within the United States, US measurements are still often used instead of metric.

=== Unit confusion ===
Care should be exercised not to intermix K-factors from metric and Imperial/US units, as the resulting factors are not equivalent or interchangeable. In case of mix-ups, results can be catastrophic.
