= Essentials of Fire Fighting =

Essentials of Fire Fighting (7th edition)
- Language: English
- Series: IFSTA Fire Training Products
- Genre: Training manual
- Publisher: Fire Protection Publications
- Publication date: November 2018
- Publication place: United States
- Media type: Print (Paperback)
- Pages: 1486
- ISBN: 978-0-87939-657-2
- Preceded by: Essentials of Fire Fighting (6th edition)

Essentials of Fire Fighting is a fire service training manual produced by Fire Protection Publications (FPP) and the International Fire Service Training Association (IFSTA). Fire Protection Publications is a department of Oklahoma State University College of Engineering, Architecture, and Technology (CEAT) in Stillwater, Oklahoma . This manual is used by fire service training agencies and departments around the world to train personnel to become firefighters. The Essentials of Fire Fighting is the required training manual used in countless local fire departments and state/provincial training agencies in every region of the United States and Canada. Since the release of the first edition of this manual in 1978, more than 2.5 million copies of the Essentials of Fire Fighting have been distributed to the fire service.

The Essentials of Fire Fighting (7th edition) is divided into 5 sections (A through E) which contain 27 chapters. Chapters 1 through 22 focus strictly on fire fighting content as required by Chapters 4 and 5 of NFPA 1001, Standard for Fire Fighter Professional Qualifications (2019 edition). Chapter 23 provides meets the training requirements for the First Aid Provider emergency medical care competencies as identified in Chapter 6 of NFPA 1001. Chapters 24 through 26 meet the First Responder Awareness and Operations Levels for Responders according to NFPA 1072, Standard for Hazardous Materials/Weapons of Mass Destruction Emergency Response Personnel Professional Qualifications (2017 Edition) and OSHA 1910.120. The chapters also provide validated content to meet competency requirements of NFPA 472, Standard for Competence of Responders to Hazardous Materials/Weapons of Mass Destruction Incidents (2018 edition). The hazardous materials information is adapted from the IFSTA Hazardous Materials for First Responders (5th Edition). Chapter 27 meets the training requirements for the National Incident Management System - Incident Command System (NIMS-ICS) for NIMS-ICS Levels 100 and 200.

== History of the Essentials of Fire Fighting ==
In 1934, the Western Actuarial Bureau sponsored a meeting in Kansas City to begin the process of gaining consensus on common training methods and techniques. State fire training directors from Oklahoma, Kansas, Missouri, and Arkansas attended and the Fire Service Training Association (FSTA) was formed. By its next meeting in 1935, 16 states were represented and more joined every year thereafter. Oklahoma A&M College (OAMC, now known as Oklahoma State University) was chosen to publish the manuals to be developed by the Fire Service Training Association. In 1935, two planographed, hardbound books were produced: Elementary Science Applied to the Firefighting Service and Ladders.

Eventually, a total of ten topics were covered and published in 1937. Because of their red covers, the fire service called them the 'Redbooks'. The ten original “Redbooks” were:

- Forcible Entry, Ropes, Knots, and Extinguishers
- Ground Ladders
- Hose
- Salvage and Overhaul
- Fire Streams
- Fire Apparatus
- Ventilation
- Rescue
- First Aid
- Fire Prevention and Inspection

In 1955, FSTA becomes the International Fire Service Training Association or IFSTA when the first Canadian officials attended and participated in the annual validation conference. In 1957, Oklahoma A&M College became Oklahoma State University. Throughout the 1950s and 1960s, IFSTA became more active in the U.S. Fire Service. IFSTA was a participant in the Williamsburg meeting that led to the formation of the Joint Council of National Fire Service Organizations. Everett Hudiburg, director of IFSTA, was selected to chair the Joint Council and spearheaded the formation of the National Professional Qualifications Board (Pro Board). The Pro Board developed professional qualifications standards and a national certification system. The four original professional qualifications standards adopted in 1974 included:

- Fire Fighters
- Fire Officers
- Fire Inspectors and Investigators
- Fire Instructors

When IFSTA realized that its products could be used to assist firefighters in achieving certification, the IFSTA manuals were revised to ensure they covered the appropriate NFPA standards. It was apparent that it would be impractical for firefighters to have to buy at least 10 manuals to meet the firefighter certification requirements.

It was decided that a single manual should be developed to assist firefighters in achieving certification, and thus the Essentials of Fire Fighting was born. Carroll Herring, director of the Louisiana Fireman Training Program (now known as the Louisiana State University Fire and Emergency Training Institute), is credited with recommending the title of Essentials of Fire Fighting. The first edition of Essentials of Fire Fighting was published in 1978 and subsequent editions have been published in 1983, 1992, 1998, 2008, and 2013. The latest edition (8th) was first released in 2024.

== Chapter list ==
The 7th edition of Essentials of Fire Fighting addresses the 2019 edition of NFPA 1001, Standard for Fire Fighter Professional Qualifications and the 2017 edition of NFPA 1072, Standard for Hazardous Materials/Weapons of Mass Destruction Emergency Response Personnel Professional Qualifications. These standards are widely accepted as the standards of knowledge and skills measurement for all firefighters in North America and beyond. Essentials of Fire Fighting includes an appendix that lists the job performance requirements from the NFPA standards and cross-references those requirements to the chapters within the manual. These chapters include:

Section A: Fire Fighter I

1. Introduction to the Fire Service and Firefighter Safety
2. Communications
3. Building Construction
4. Fire Dynamics
5. Firefighter Personal Protective Equipment
6. Portable Extinguishers
7. Ropes and Knots
8. Ground Ladders
9. Forcible Entry
10. Structural Search and Rescue
11. Tactical Ventilation
12. Fire Hose
13. Hose Operations and Hose Streams
14. Fire Suppression
15. Overhaul, Property Conservation, and Scene Preservation

Section B: Fire Fighter II

16. Building Materials, Structural Collapse, and Effects of Fire Suppression
17. Technical Rescue Support and Vehicle Extrication Operations
18. Foam Fire Fighting, Liquid Fires, and Gas Fires
19. Incident Scene Operations
20. Fire Origin and Cause Determination
21. Maintenance and Testing Responsibilities
22. Community Risk Reduction

Section C: Emergency First Aid, Fire Fighter I

23. First Aid Provider

Section D: Hazardous Materials Response for Firefighters, Fire Fighter I

24. Analyzing the Incident
25. Action Options and Response Objectives
26. Personal Protective Equipment, Product Control, and Decontamination

Section E: NIMS-ICS 100 and 200, Fire Fighter I and II and Hazardous Materials Responder

27. National Incident Management System - Incident Command Structure

== See also ==
- Fire Protection Publications (FPP)
- International Fire Service Training Association (IFSTA)
- National Fire Protection Association
