= Craig Brian Stunkel =

Nvidia Principal Engineer in HPC Networking

Craig Brian Stunkel is currently a Principal Engineer in HPC Networking at Nvidia, where he contributes to efforts involving Nvidia's Quantum InfiniBand high-speed networks that are prevalent in supercomputers and deep learning systems. Prior to joining Nvidia in 2020, Craig was a Principal Research Staff Member at IBM's T. J. Watson Research Center in Yorktown Heights, NY. He codesigned and contributed to many generations of HPC networks, starting with the IBM SP supercomputers in the 1990s.

== Awards ==
Craig Brian Stunkel received the B.S. and M.S. degrees in electrical engineering from Oklahoma State University, and the Ph.D. degree in electrical engineering from the University of Illinois, Urbana-Champaign in 1990.

Dr. Stunkel was named a Fellow of the Institute of Electrical and Electronics Engineers (IEEE) in 2013 for his contributions to the design and implementation of high-performance interconnection networks.

Craig was inducted into the Hall of Fame of the Oklahoma State University College of Engineering, Architecture, and Technology in 2023.
