= Life Safety Code =

US fire protection standard

The publication Life Safety Code, known as NFPA 101, is a consensus standard widely adopted in the United States. It is administered, trademarked, copyrighted, and published by the National Fire Protection Association and, like many NFPA documents, is systematically revised on a three-year cycle.

Despite its title, the standard is not a legal code, is not published as an instrument of law, and has no statutory authority in its own right. However, it is deliberately crafted with language suitable for mandatory application to facilitate adoption into law by those empowered to do so.

The bulk of the standard addresses "those construction, protection, and occupancy features necessary to minimize danger to life from the effects of fire, including smoke, heat, and toxic gases created during a fire.". The standard does not address the "general fire prevention or building construction features that are normally a function of fire prevention codes and building codes".

== History ==
The Life Safety Code was originated in 1913 by the Committee on Safety to Life (one of the NFPA's more than 200 committees). As noted in the 1991 Life Safety Code Handbook; "...the Committee devoted its attention to a study of notable fires involving loss of life and to analyzing the causes of that loss of life. This work led to the preparation of standards for the construction of stairways, fire escapes, and similar structures; for fire drills in various occupancies and for the construction and arrangement of exit facilities for factories, schools and other occupancies, which form the basis of the present Code." This study became the basis for two early NFPA publications, "Outside Stairs for Fire Exits" (1916) and "Safeguarding Factory Workers from Fire" (1918).

In 1921 the Committee on Safety to Life expanded and the publication they generated in 1927 became known as the Building Exits Code. New editions were published in 1929, 1934, 1936, 1938, 1942 and 1946.

After a disastrous series of fires between 1942 and 1946, including the Cocoanut Grove Nightclub fire in Boston, which claimed the lives of 492 people and the Winecoff Hotel fire in Atlanta which claimed 119 lives, the Building Exits Code began to be utilized as potential legal legislation. The verbiage of the code, however, was intended for building contractors and not legal statutes, so the NFPA decided to re-edit the Code and some revisions appeared in the 1948, 1949, 1951 and 1952 publications. The editions published in 1957, 1958, 1959, 1960, 1961 and 1963 refined the verbiage and presentation even further.

In 1955 the NPFA101 was broken into three separate documents, NFPA101B (covering nursing homes) and NFPA101C (covering interior finishes). NFPA101C was revised once in 1956 before both publications were withdrawn and pertinent passages re-incorporated back into the main body.

The Committee on Safety to Life was restructured in 1963 and the first publication in 1966 was a complete revision. The title was changed from Building Exits Code to Code for Safety to Life from Fire in Buildings and Structures. The final revision to all "code language" (legalese) was made and it was decided that the Code would be revised and republished on a three-year schedule.

New editions were subsequently published in 1967, 1970, 1973 and 1976. The Committee was reorganized again in 1977 and the 1981 edition of the Code featured major editorial and structural changes that reflect the organization of the modern Code.

== Ongoing amendment ==
Codes produced by NFPA are continually updated to incorporate new technologies as well as lessons learned from actual fire experiences.

The fire at The Station nightclub in 2003, which claimed the lives of 100 and injured more than 200, resulted in swift attention to several amendments specific to nightclubs and large crowds.

== Current code ==
The Life Safety Code is unusual among safety codes in that it applies to existing structures as well as new structures. When a Code revision is adopted into local law, existing structures may have a grace period before they must comply, but all structures must comply with code. In some cases, the authority having jurisdiction can simply permit previously approved features to be used under specified conditions. In other cases, the local law amends the Code to omit undesired sections prior to its adoption.

When some or all of the Code is adopted as regulations in a jurisdiction, it can be enforced by inspectors from local zoning boards, fire departments, building inspectors, fire marshals or other bodies and authorities having jurisdiction.

In particular, the Life Safety Code deals with hazards to human life in buildings, public and private conveyances and other human occupancies, but only when permanently fixed to a foundation, attached to a building, or permanently moored for human habitation. Regardless of official adoption as regulations, Life Safety Code provides a valuable source for determination of liability in accidents, and many codes and related standards are sponsored by insurance companies.

The Life Safety Code is coordinated with hundreds of other building codes and standards such as National Electrical Code NFPA 70, fuel-gas, mechanical, plumbing (for sprinklers and standpipes), energy and fire codes.

Normally, the Life Safety Code is used by architects and designers of vehicles and vessels used for human occupancy. Since the Life Safety Code is a valuable source for determining liability in accidents, it is also used by insurance companies to evaluate risks and set rates, not to mention assessment of compliance after an incident.

In the United States, the words Life Safety Code and NFPA 101 are registered trademarks of NFPA. All or part of the NFPA's Life Safety Code are adopted as local regulations throughout the country.

== Sample sections ==
This listing of chapters from the 2009 edition shows the scope of the Code.

Beyond the policies, core definitions and topical requirements of chapters 1–11, chapters 12–42 address the specific requirements for each listed class of occupancy, making reference to Chapters 1–11, as well as other codes.

- 1. Administration
- 2. Referenced Publications
- 3. Definitions
- 4. General
- 5. Performance Based Option
- 6. Classification of Occupancy and Hazard of Contents
- 7. Means of Egress
- 8. Features of Fire Protection
- 9. Building Service and Fire Protection Equipment
- 10. Interior Finish, Contents and Furnishings
- 11. Special structures and High Rise Buildings
- 12. New Assembly Occupancies
- 13. Existing Assembly Occupancies
- 14. New Educational Occupancies
- 15. Existing Educational Occupancies
- 16 New Day-Care Occupancies
- 17. Existing Day Care Occupancies
- 18. New Health Care Occupancies
- 19. Existing Health Care Occupancies
- 20. New Ambulatory Health Care Occupancies
- 21. Existing Ambulatory Health Care Occupancies
- 22. New Detention and Correctional Occupancies
- 23. Existing Detention and Correctional Occupancies
- 24. One- and Two-Family Dwellings
- 25. Reserved
- 26. Lodging and Rooming Houses
- 27. Reserved
- 28. New Hotels and Dormitories
- 29. Existing Hotels and Dormitories
- 30. New Apartment Buildings
- 31. Existing Apartment Buildings
- 32. New Residential Board and Care Occupancies
- 33. Existing Residential Board and Care Facilities
- 34. Reserved
- 35. Reserved
- 36. New Mercantile Occupancies
- 37. Existing Mercantile Occupancies
- 38. New Business Occupancies
- 39. Existing Business Occupancies
- 40. Industrial Occupancies
- 41. Reserved
- 42. Storage Occupancies
- 43. Building Rehabilitation (first appeared in 2006 Code)
- Annex A: Explanatory material
- Annex B: Use of elevators for early evacuation
- Annex C: Supplemental Evacuation Equipment

The Code and corresponding Handbook also include several supplemental publications including:

- Case Histories: Fires Influencing the Life Safety Code
- Fire Alarm Systems for Life Safety Code Users (NFPA 72 and related standards)
- Brief Introduction to Sprinkler Systems... (NFPA 13)
- Fire Test Standards (According to 25 different codes)
- Home Security and Fire Safety (crime prevention versus fire safety)
- Application of Performance Based Design Concepts
- Technical and substantive changes

== See also ==
- Building code
- Fire code
- Fire Safety Equivalency System
- Sanitation code
- OSHA
- Electrical code
