= Fire Protection Publications =

- Parent company: Oklahoma State University College of Engineering, Architecture, and Technology
- Founded: 1973
- Country of origin: United States
- Headquarters location: Stillwater, Oklahoma
- Publication types: Training manuals, curriculums, videos, eBooks, apps, course management system
- Imprints: FPP (non-validated materials) IFSTA (validated materials)

Fire Protection Publications (FPP) is a department of the College of Engineering, Architecture, and Technology (CEAT) a division within Oklahoma State University (OSU), in Stillwater, Oklahoma. FPP is the world's leading publisher of training materials for the fire and emergency services. FPP also serves as the headquarters for the International Fire Service Training Association (IFSTA). FPP and IFSTA have worked together to bring the fire service quality training materials for more than 85 years.

The primary function of Fire Protection Publications is to publish and disseminate training manuals as proposed and validated by IFSTA. IFSTA committee members provide the technical review and validation of the manuals. Fire Protection Publications researches, acquires, produces, and distributes these manuals. A partial list of validated training manuals produced by FPP under the IFSTA imprint include:

- Essentials of Fire Fighting
- Fire and Emergency Services Company Officer
- Chief Officer
- Fire and Emergency Services Instructor
- Fire Investigator
- Hazardous Materials for the First Responder
- Hazardous Materials Technician
- Facility Fire Brigades
- Principles of Vehicle Extrication

FPP also publishes a number of non-validated books related to fire service training under the FPP imprint. A partial list of these include:

- Fire Prevention Applications
- Plans Examiner for Fire and Emergency Services
- Firefighter's Handbook On Wildland Firefighting
- Ground Cover Fire Fighting for Structural Firefighters
- Fire Service Hydraulics and Water Supply
- Rapid Intervention Teams

FPP also produces a full line of teaching and learning materials to supplement many of the training manuals. These include exam preparatory guides, curriculums, videos, apps, eBooks, and the ResourceOne course management system. FPP/IFSTA extends the knowledge and technology of the OSU to the state, the nation, and the world in fulfillment of the OSU land grant university mission of extension and outreach.

FPP also houses an extensive research division. This division secures external funding for projects that contribute to the body of knowledge of fire and emergency leadership and management and fire and life safety education. One such contribution is the International Fire Service Journal of Leadership and Management (IFSJLM), a refereed journal that publishes peer-reviewed articles that relate to the theory and practice of leadership and management in the fire and emergency services. The research division has also developed fire safety materials for target audiences that are at higher risk for fire death and injuries, specifically people with disabilities and young children. Partnerships are a vital mechanism for the research activities. Partners include Oklahoma ABLETech, the OSU Center for Early Childhood Teaching and Learning, the OSU Fire Protection and Safety Technology faculty and students, the OSU Center for Teaching and Learning Excellence, the National Fallen Fighter Foundation, and the national Everyone Goes Home Initiative to reduce line of duty deaths (LODD).

In cooperation with the United States Fire Administration, the research division has also conducted extensive research on emergency responder response and roadway incident safety, traffic incident management system, responder and apparatus visibility and conspicuity issues, and funding alternatives for emergency response organizations.

== See also ==
- International Fire Service Training Association
- Essentials of Fire Fighting
