= Vehicle fire suppression system =

Vehicle Fire Suppression System
- Process type: Safety system

A vehicle fire suppression system is a pre-engineered fire suppression system safety accessory permanently mounted on any type of vehicle. These systems are especially prevalent in the mobile heavy equipment segment and are designed to protect equipment assets from fire damage and related losses. Vehicle fire suppression systems have become a vital safety feature to several industries and are most commonly used in the mining, forestry, landfill, and mass transit industries.

== Parts of a typical system ==
A typical vehicle fire suppression system has five key components:

1. Fire-detecting linear wire or spot sensors,
2. A control panel to detect a fire and alert the operator,
3. Actuators discharge automatically or manually to activate the system,
4. Tanks filled with fire-fighting agent, and
5. A distribution network of tubes, hoses, and nozzles.

To mitigate a fire as soon as it happens, fire-detecting linear wire or sensors are strategically placed around the machine. When the high heat of a fire penetrates the linear wire or is detected by the sensors, a signal is sent to the control panel in the vehicle cab.

The control panel alarms and alerts the driver to quickly evacuate the machine. At the same time, the panel automatically initiates the actuator, which discharges the fire-fighting agent inside the onboard tanks and sends it through a distribution network composed of stainless steel tubing and/or hydraulic hosing. An actuator can also activate the system when pressed manually by the operator.

At the end of the distribution network, the agent is disbursed into the equipment’s protected areas via nozzles aimed at the machine's high-hazard components, like turbochargers, starters, fuel filters, batteries, alternators, and transmissions to extinguish the fire quickly and efficiently.
