= Telecommunications systems management =

Telecommunications systems management (Telecomm or TSM for short, also Telecommunication systems, Telecommunications management, Network management) is an interdisciplinary area of study offered at some colleges, universities and other educational establishments to fill the need for a liaison between the technical aspect and the business aspect of telecommunications. At Murray State University it has been regarded as a half-and-half program, half business and half networking classes with the option to specialize in certain aspects in the field. For example web-based telecommunications.

Management involves integration of different information sources and the decision making process related to those systems.

== Colleges and Universities Offering TSM ==
- California State University, East Bay
- Capitol College
- DePaul University
- Istanbul Technical University
- Midlands Technical College
- Murray State University
- University of Athens
- New Jersey Institute of Technology
- New York Institute Of Technology
- Northeastern
- Ohio University
- Oklahoma State University (College of Engineering, Architecture, and Technology)
- Stevens Institute of Technology
- Syracuse University
- Trident Technical College
- University of Maryland University College
- University of Pennsylvania
- Indian Institute of Technology Delhi - Department of Management Studies (DMS-IIT Delhi)
