= Fire Safety Evaluation System =

The Fire Safety Evaluation System (FSES) is a system used in the United States to evaluate the overall level of a building's fire safety. FSES applies to health care, prisons and jails, offices, laboratory buildings, and overnight accommodations in National Parks.

FSES values are provided in the National Fire Protection Association (NFPA) Standard 101A, Guide on Alternative Approaches to Life Safety.

A FSES evaluation defines the relative impact of a deficiency or proposed improvement to the building. It also provides a means of comparing the effectiveness of proposed improvements by producing a comparative baseline and readily shows the relative gain in fire safety for proposed improvements.

Fire sprinklers have an extensive impact on fire safety and are therefore allotted a high value in the FSES.
