= Traffic incident management =

Emergency responders evaluating and responding to a multi-vehicle traffic accident

Traffic incident management (TIM) is an aspect of incident management that encompasses the use of various resources—such as human or technical resources—to reduce the impact of and restore normal operations following traffic incidents, most often stalls and collisions. The stated goal of TIM is to restore normal traffic flow after an interruption in a safe and rapid manner. A wide array of planning resources, frameworks, and best practices have been established to better achieve this goal and address hazards that may arise during incident remediation. A 2011 review of TIM states that programs associated with the term have existed for at least 20 years, noting that they have expanded from simple plans designed to clear roadways of incidents to works encompassing incident prediction, incident verification, and response time optimization.

== Problems in traffic incident management ==
=== Incident verification ===
Groups responding to incidents are often notified through inconsistent means. Emergency responders and law enforcement are often the first to be notified of an incident, but the quality of the information they receive from motorists who discover the incident may be poor. Dispatchers may become overwhelmed by multiple callers at the same incident, or in less populated areas, an incident may go unnoticed for some time. The driving culture and political organization may vary across regions, with road authorities varying greatly across political boundaries, so response plans cannot be easily standardized.

=== Congestion and traveler information ===
Blocking one or more lanes on a multi-lane road, whether due to road maintenance, construction, or a traffic incident, significantly reduces the traffic capacity of that road. Blocking a single lane on a three-lane road causes the capacity of the road at that point to decrease by roughly half. Providing travelers with information, such as if they need to move to another lane or take a detour, can reduce the impact of a traffic incident and prevent secondary accidents, e.g., a multiple-vehicle collision. However, inaccurate information can exacerbate issues further or lead to travelers becoming desensitized to information, such as that provided on roadside variable-message signs. The average traffic incident inflicts a significant material cost on motorists due to delays; a 2011 study by Kabit and colleagues on traffic incidents in Australia found that the cost of a two-hour delay with one lane blocked was AU$5,581 due to delays, fuel consumption and CO_{2} emissions. The same 2-hour delay with full lane blockage (e.g., no possiblility of passing by the accident) had a cost of AU$222,287.

== Management methods ==
While some jurisdictions have designated organizations or contact centers that handle all aspects of traffic incidents, such as the Rijkswaterstaat in the Netherlands, most countries designate local police as being responsible for traffic incident management. There is no universally defined methodology to resolve traffic incidents, though most surveyed groups agree that the purpose of TIM is to reduce congestion. TIM organizations typically classify incidents based on their impact to travel, ranging from crashes that block one or two lanes to major snowstorms that interrupt travel for hours and up to accidents involving hazardous materials that may take upwards of a day to resolve. The severity of an incident informs how resources should be assigned and what incident management plans are appropriate. The response process, once an incident and the involved motorists are detected, verified, and identified, usually follows a process of dispatching response units (such as police, emergency medical services, or fire engines), managing personnel on site and controlling traffic signals (if necessary), and clearing any wreckage or debris produced as a result of the incident to allow traffic to flow freely again. The final clearance step may require repair to infrastructure if necessary. This may include fixing damaged road barriers or repairing pavement damage to prevent further incidents caused by poor road conditions.
