= Fire sprinkler =

Component that discharges water to protect buildings

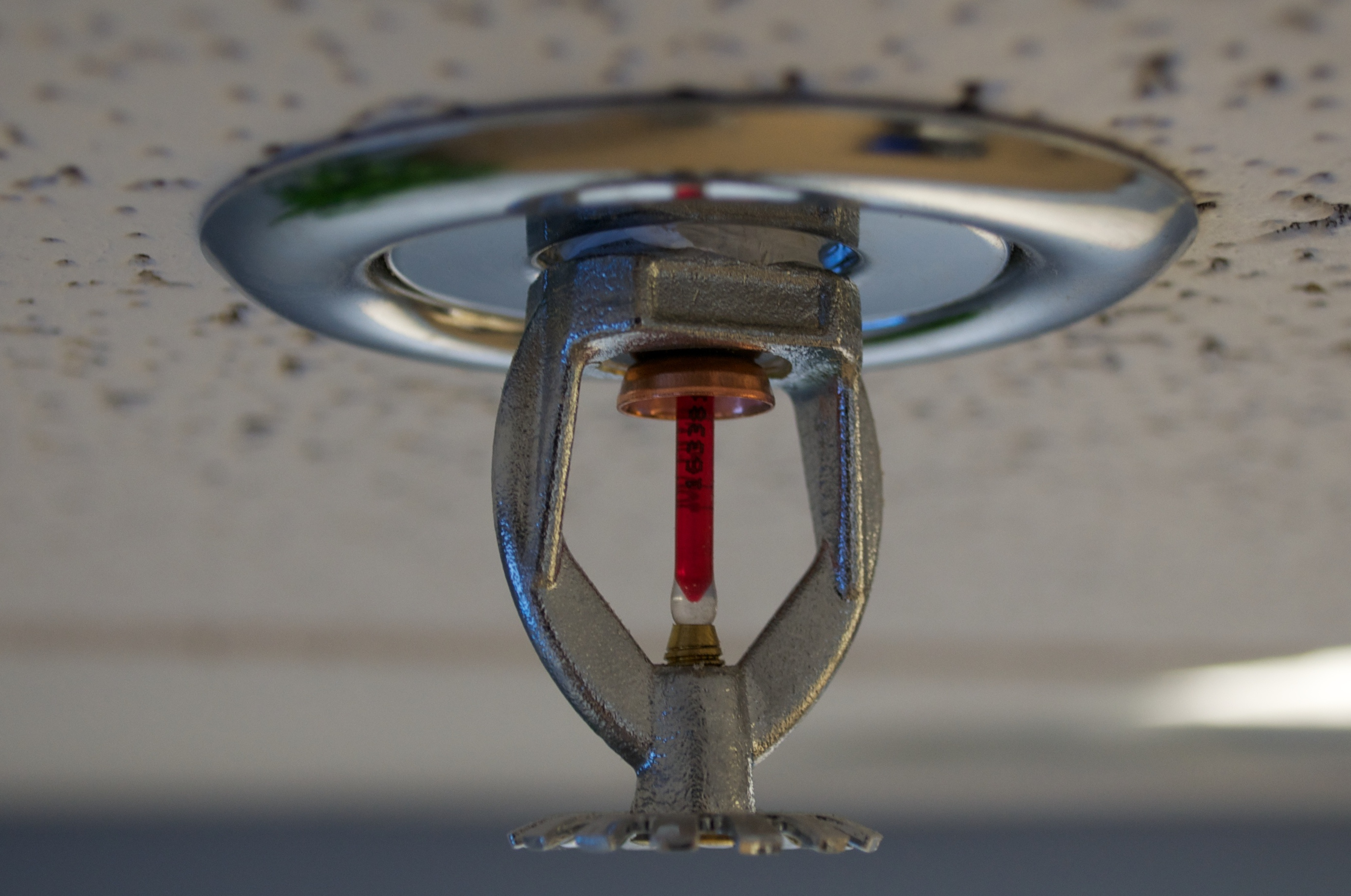
A fire sprinkler mounted on a ceiling

A fire sprinkler or sprinkler head is the component of a fire sprinkler system that discharges water when the effects of a fire have been detected, such as when a predetermined temperature has been exceeded. Fire sprinklers are extensively used worldwide, with over 40 million sprinkler heads fitted each year. In buildings protected by properly designed and maintained fire sprinklers, over 99% of fires were controlled by fire sprinklers alone.

== History ==
In 1812, British inventor Sir William Congreve patented a manual sprinkler system using perforated pipes along the ceiling. When someone noticed a fire, a valve outside the building could be opened to send water through the pipes. It was not until a short time later that, as a result of a large furniture factory that repeatedly burned down, Hiram Stevens Maxim was consulted on how to prevent a recurrence and invented the first automatic fire sprinkler. It would douse the areas that were on fire and report the fire to the fire station. Maxim was unable to sell the idea elsewhere, though when the patent expired, the idea was used.

In 1872, Thomas J. Martin was awarded a patent for improvement to the fire extinguisher which involved the use of pipes to carry water upwards and valves in the ceiling acting as sprinklers to extinguish fires in buildings. In 1874, Henry S. Parmalee of New Haven, Connecticut, created and installed the first automatic fire sprinkler system, using solder that melted in a fire to unplug holes in the otherwise sealed water pipes. He was the president of Mathusek Piano Works, and invented his sprinkler system in response to exorbitantly high insurance rates. Parmelee patented his idea and had great success with it in the U.S., calling his invention the "automatic fire extinguisher". He then traveled to Europe to demonstrate his method to stop a building fire before total destruction.

Parmelee's invention did not get as much attention as he had planned, as most people could not afford to install a sprinkler system. Once he realized this, he turned his efforts to educating insurance companies about his system. He explained that the sprinkler system would reduce the loss ratio, and thus save money for the insurance companies. He knew that he could never succeed in obtaining contracts from the business owners to install his system unless he could ensure for them a reasonable return in the form of reduced premiums.

In this connection, he was able to enlist the interest of two men, who both had connections in the insurance industry. The first of was Major Hesketh, a cotton spinner in a large business in Bolton who was also chairman of the Bolton Cotton Trades Mutual Insurance Company. The directors of this company and its secretary, Peter Kevan, took an interest in Parmelee's early experiments. Hesketh got Parmelee his first order for sprinkler installations in the cotton spinning mills of John Stones & Company, at Astley Bridge, Bolton. This was followed soon afterwards by an order from the Alexandra Mills, owned by John Butler of the same town.

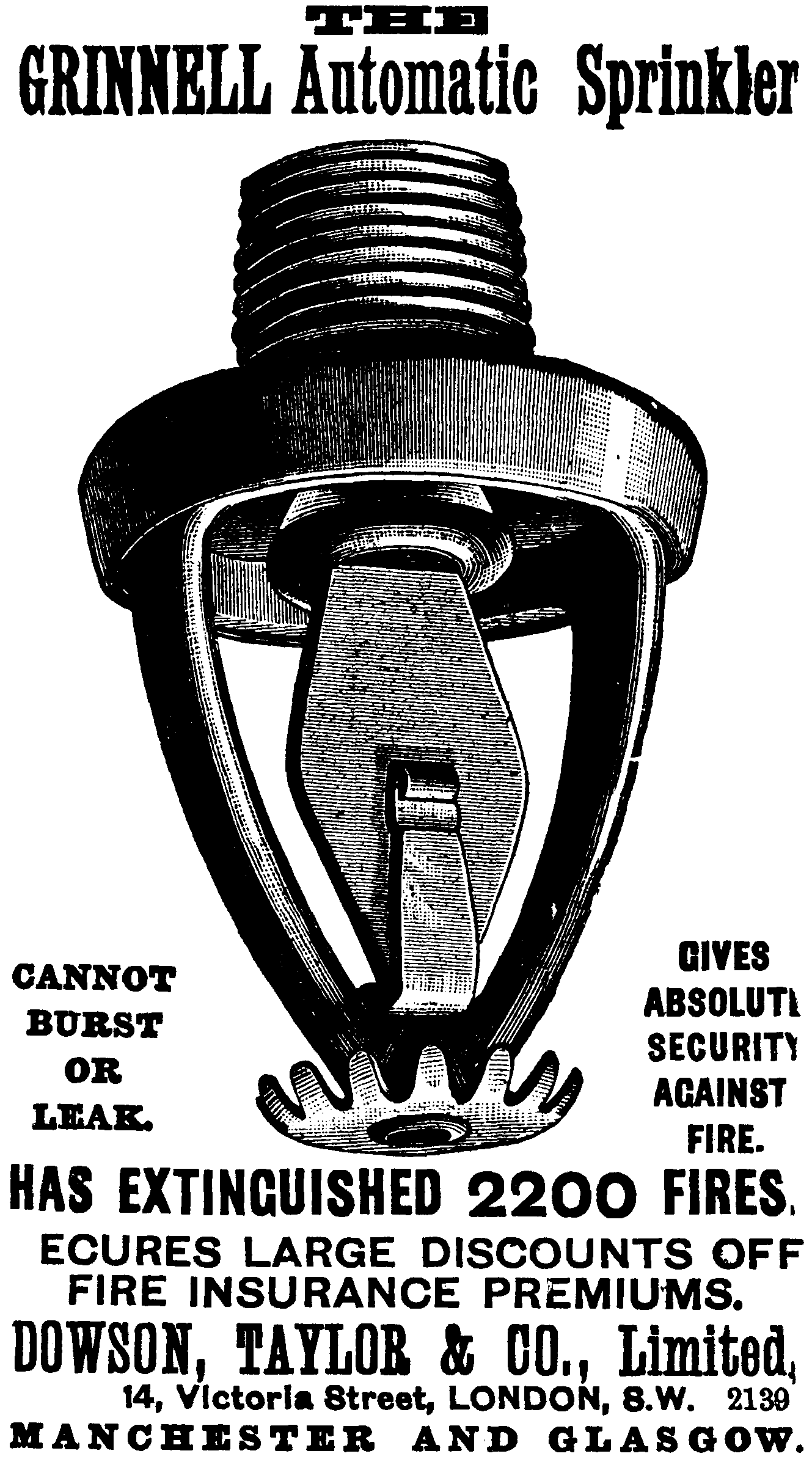
An 1897 Grinnell automatic sprinkler advertisement

Although Parmelee got two sales through its efforts, the Bolton Cotton Trades Mutual Insurance Company was not a very big company outside of its local area. Parmelee needed a wider influence. He found this influence in James North Lane, the manager of the Mutual Fire Insurance Corporation of Manchester. This company was founded in 1870 by the Textile Manufacturers' Associations of Lancashire and Yorkshire as a protest against high insurance rates. They had a policy of encouraging risk management and more particularly the use of the most up-to-date and scientific apparatus for extinguishing fires. Even though he put tremendous effort and time into educating the masses on his sprinkler system, by 1883 only about 10 factories were protected by the Parmelee sprinkler.

Back in the U.S., Frederick Grinnell, who was manufacturing the Parmelee sprinkler, designed the more effective Grinnell sprinkler. He increased sensitivity by removing the fusible joint from all contact with the water, and, by seating a valve in the center of a flexible diaphragm, he relieved the low-fusing soldered joint of the strain of water pressure. By this means, the valve seat was forced against the valve by the water pressure, producing a self-closing action. The greater the water pressure, the tighter the valve. The flexible diaphragm had a further and more important function. It caused the valve and its seat to move outwards simultaneously until the solder joint was completely severed. Grinnell got a patent for his version of the sprinkler system. He also took his invention to Europe, where it was a much bigger success than the Parmelee version. Eventually, the Parmelee system was withdrawn, opening the path for Grinnell and his invention.

== US regulations ==
Fire sprinkler application and installation guidelines, and overall fire sprinkler system design guidelines are provided by the National Fire Protection Association (NFPA) 13, (NFPA) 13D, and (NFPA) 13R and enforced by local jurisdictions.

Certain states, including California, Pennsylvania and Illinois, require sprinklers in at least some new residential construction.

Fire sprinklers can be automatic or open orifice. Automatic fire sprinklers use a fusible element that activates at a predetermined temperature. The fusible element either melts or has a frangible liquid-containing glass bulb that breaks, causing the water pressure in the fire sprinkler piping to push a plug out of the sprinkler orifice, resulting in water spraying from the orifice. The water stream strikes a deflector that forms the water into a spray pattern designed in support of the goals of the sprinkler type (i.e., control or suppression). Modern sprinkler heads are designed to direct spray downwards. Spray nozzles are available to provide spray in various directions and patterns. The majority of automatic fire sprinklers operate individually in a fire. Contrary to motion picture representation, the entire sprinkler system does not activate at the same time, unless the system is a special deluge type.

Open orifice sprinklers are only used in water spray systems or deluge sprinklers systems. They are identical to the automatic sprinkler on which they are based, with the heat-sensitive operating element removed.

Automatic fire sprinklers utilizing frangible bulbs follow a standardized color-coding convention indicating their operating temperature. Activation temperatures correspond to the type of hazard against which the sprinkler system protects. Residential occupancies are provided with a special type of fast response sprinkler with the unique goal of life safety (a residential sprinkler has a higher discharge pattern than that of a standard spray sprinkler and they also have been specifically developed for discharging water higher on the walls in order to keep ceiling gas temperatures lower).

=== Quick response sprinklers ===
The 2002 edition of the NFPA #13 standard, section 3.6.1 defines quick response sprinklers as having a response time index (RTI) of 50 (meter-seconds)^{1/2} or less. RTI is a measure of how thermally responsive the heat-responsive element of the sprinkler is, measured as the time needed to raise the temperature of the sprinkler bulb to 63% of the temperature of the hot air stream times the square root of the velocity of the air stream.

The term quick response refers to the listing of the entire sprinkler (including spacing, density and location) not just the fast responding releasing element. Many standard response sprinklers, such as extended coverage ordinary hazard (ECOH) sprinklers, have fast responding (low thermal mass elements) in order to pass their fire tests. Quick response sprinklers are available with standard spray deflectors, but they are also available with extended coverage deflectors.

QUICK RESPONSE FIRE SPRINKLERS
Quick response per NFPA 13 RTI < 50 (m•s)^{1/2}	Nominal diameter in mm	Norbulb model	Operating time in seconds	Response time index (RTI) (m•s)^{1/2}
Yes	2.5	N2.5	9	25
Yes	3	N3	11.5	33
Yes	3.3	N3.3	13.5	38
No	5	NF5	23	65
No	5	N5	32	90

== Operation ==
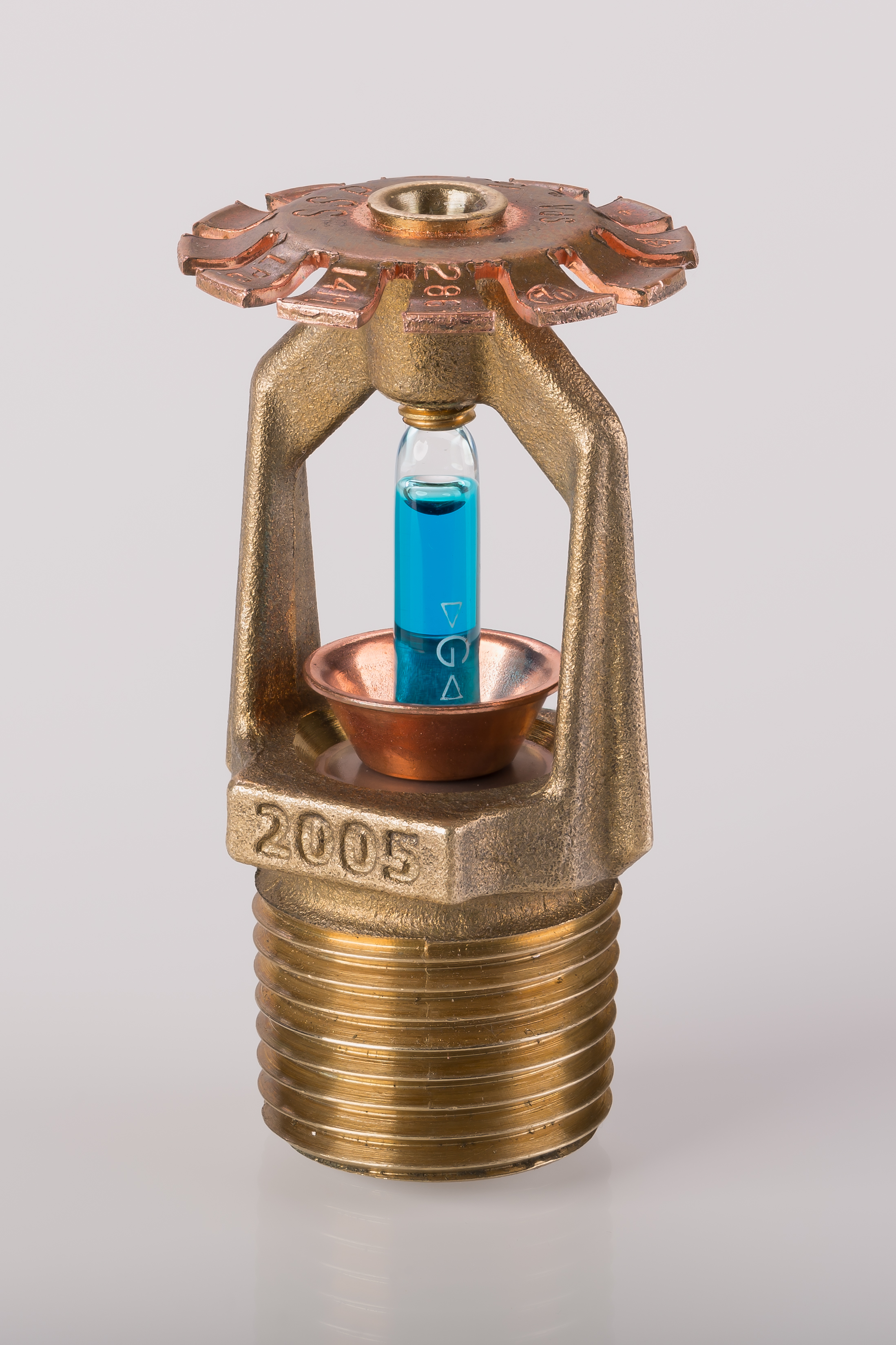
Standard spray sprinkler head with a blue bulb indicating a high release temperature

Each closed-head sprinkler is held closed by either a heat-sensitive glass bulb (see below) or a two-part metal link held together with a fusible alloy such as Wood's metal and other alloys with similar compositions. The glass bulb or link applies pressure to a pipe cap which acts as a plug which prevents water from flowing until the ambient temperature around the sprinkler reaches the design activation temperature of the individual sprinkler. Because each sprinkler activates independently when the predetermined heat level is reached, the number of sprinklers that operate is limited to only those near the fire, thereby maximizing the available water pressure over the point of fire origin.

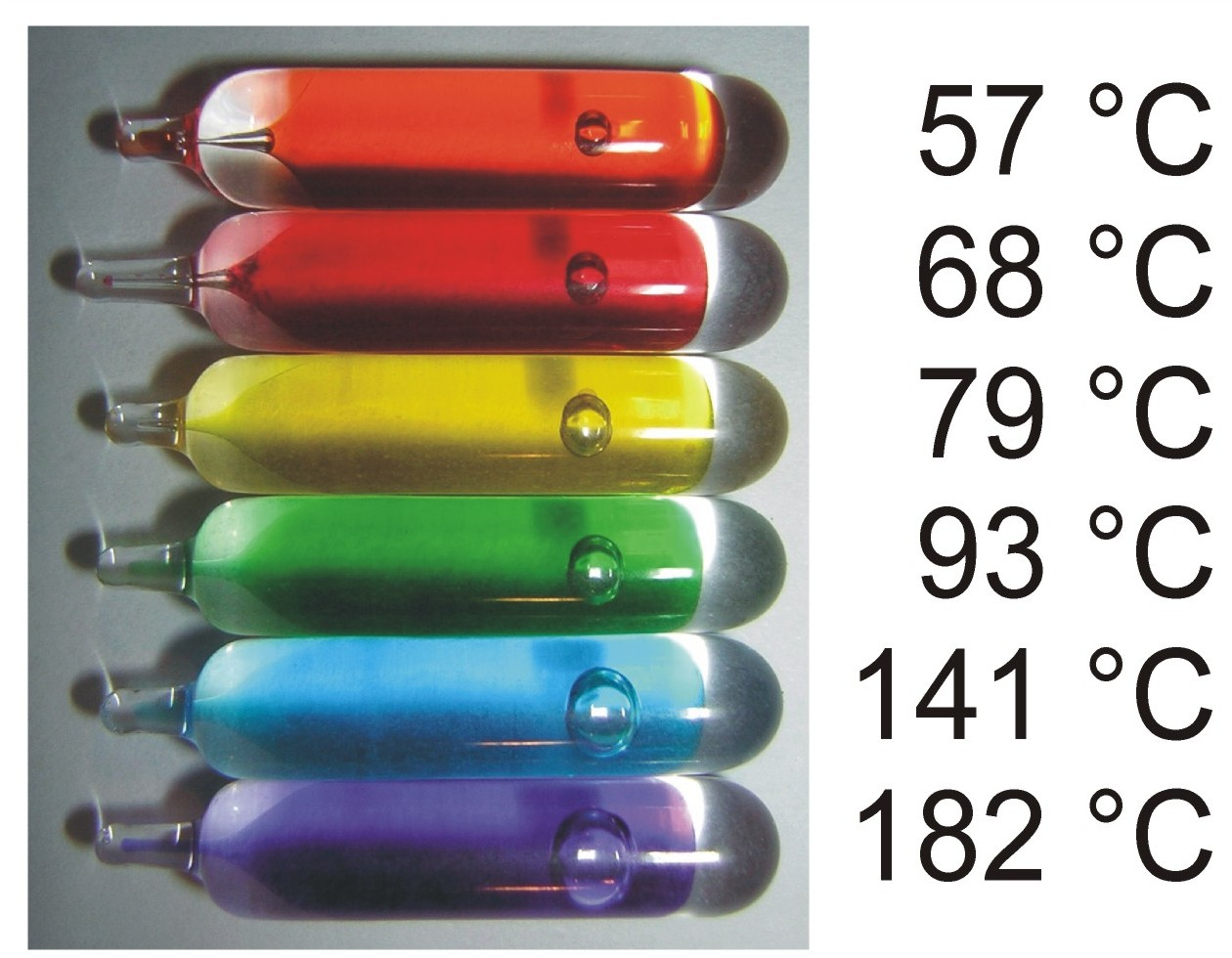
The liquid in the glass bulb is color coded to show its temperature rating.

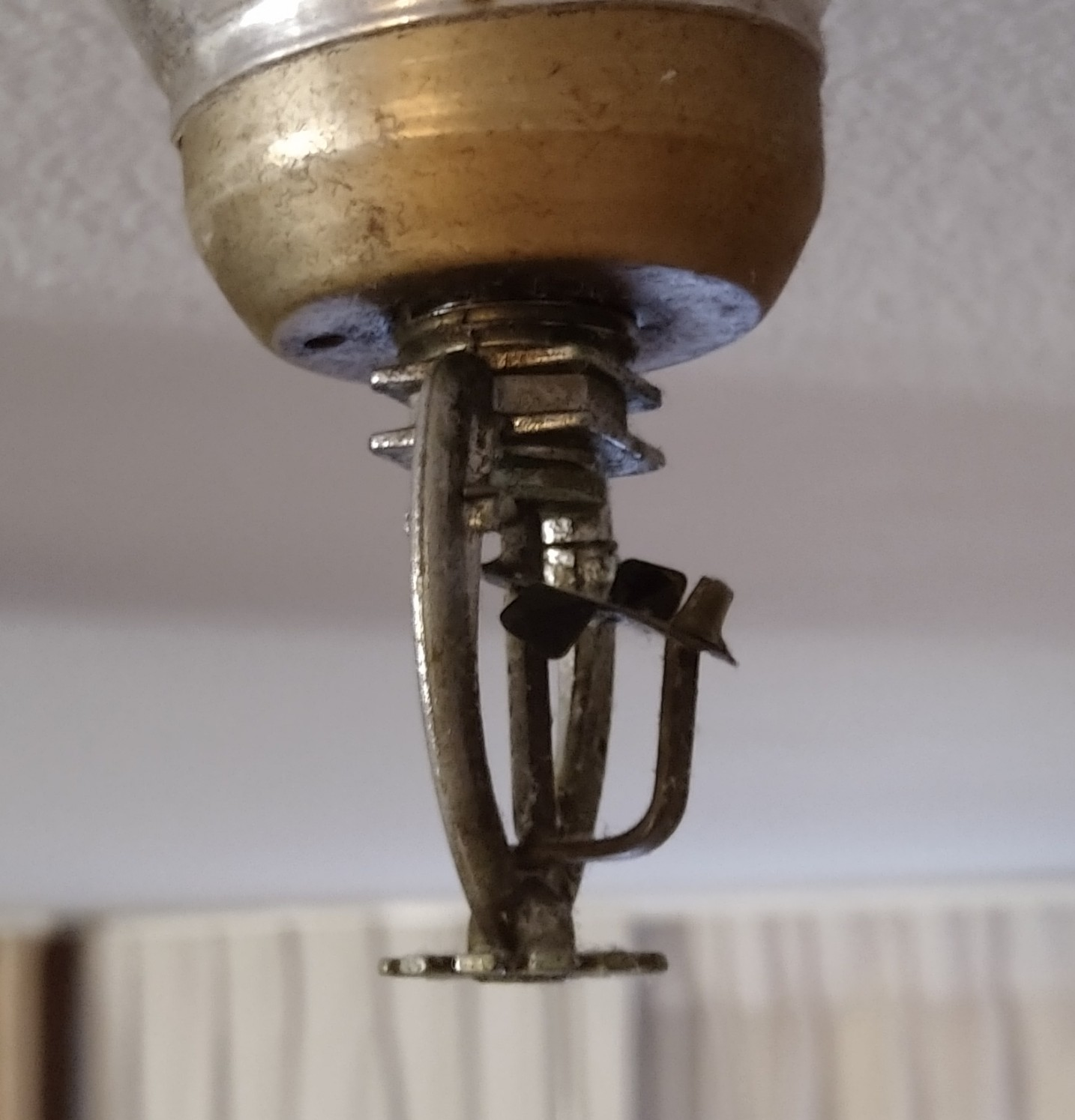
Fusible link sprinkler head

The bulb breaks as a result of the thermal expansion of the liquid inside the bulb. The time it takes before a bulb breaks is dependent on the temperature. Below the design temperature, it does not break, and above the design temperature, it breaks, taking less time to break as temperature increases above the design threshold. The response time is expressed as a response time index (RTI), which typically has values between 35 and 250 m^{½}s^{½}, where a low value indicates a fast response. Under standard testing procedures (135 °C air at a velocity of 2.5 m/s), a 68 °C sprinkler bulb will break within 7 to 33 seconds, depending on the RTI. The RTI can also be specified in imperial units, where 1 ft^{½}s^{½} is equivalent to 0.55 m^{½}s^{½}. The sensitivity of a sprinkler can be negatively affected if the thermal element has been painted.

Maximum ceiling temperature	Temperature rating	Temperature classification	Color code (with fusible link)	Liquid alcohol in glass bulb color
100 °F; 38 °C	135–170 °F; 57–77 °C	Ordinary	Uncolored or Black	Orange (135 °F; 57 °C) or Red (155 °F; 68 °C)
150 °F; 66 °C	175–225 °F; 79–107 °C	Intermediate	White	Yellow (175 °F; 79 °C) or Green (200 °F; 93 °C)
225 °F (107 °C)	250–300 °F (121–149 °C)	High	Blue	
300 °F (149 °C)	325–375 °F (163–191 °C)	Extra High	Red	Purple
375 °F (191 °C)	400–475 °F (204–246 °C)	Very Extra High	Green	Black
475 °F (246 °C)	500–575 °F (260–302 °C)	Ultra High	Orange	Black
625 °F (329 °C)	650 °F (343 °C)	Ultra High	Orange	Black

From Table 6.2.5.1 NFPA13 2007 Edition indicates the maximum ceiling temperature, nominal operating temperature of the sprinkler, color of the bulb or link and the temperature classification.

== Types ==
There are several types of sprinklers:

- Quick response
- Standard response
- CMSA (control mode specific application)
- Residential
- ESFR (early suppression fast response)

=== ESFR ===
ESFR (early suppression fast response) refers to both a concept and a type of sprinkler. "The concept is that fast response of sprinklers can produce an advantage in a fire if the response is accompanied by an effective discharge density — that is, a sprinkler spray capable of fighting its way down through the fire plume in sufficient quantities to suppress the burning fuel package." The sprinkler that was developed for this concept was created for use in high rack storage.

ESFR sprinkler heads were developed in the 1980s to take advantage of the latest fast-response fire sprinkler technology to provide fire suppression of specific high-challenge fire hazards. Prior to the introduction of these sprinklers, protection systems were designed to control fires until the arrival of the fire department.

== See also ==
- Active fire protection
- Automatic fire suppression
- Building code
- Fire Safety Evaluation System
- Hydraulic calculation
- K-factor (fire protection)
- Piping
- Tyco International
- Victaulic
