= Fire protection engineering =

Formal approach to protecting against fires

Fire protection engineering is the application of science and engineering principles to protect people, property, and their environments from the harmful and destructive effects of fire and smoke. It encompasses engineering which focuses on fire detection, suppression and mitigation and fire safety engineering which focuses on human behavior and maintaining a tenable environment for evacuation from a fire. In the United States 'fire protection engineering' is often used to include 'fire safety engineering'.

The discipline of fire engineering includes, but is not exclusive to:

- Fire detection – fire alarm systems and brigade call systems
- Active fire protection – fire suppression systems
- Passive fire protection – fire and smoke barriers, space separation
- Smoke control and management
- Escape facilities – emergency exits, fire lifts, etc.
- Building design, layout, and space planning
- Fire prevention programs
- Fire dynamics and fire modeling
- Human behavior during fire events
- Risk analysis, including economic factors
- Wildfire management

Fire protection engineers identify risks and design safeguards that aid in preventing, controlling, and mitigating the effects of fires. Fire engineers assist architects, building owners and developers in evaluating buildings' life safety and property protection goals. Fire engineers are also employed as fire investigators, including such very large-scale cases as the analysis of the collapse of the World Trade Center. NASA uses fire engineers in its space program to help improve safety. Fire engineers are also employed to provide 3rd party review for performance based fire engineering solutions submitted in support of local building regulation applications.

== History ==
Fire engineering's roots date back to ancient Rome, when the Emperor Nero ordered the city to be rebuilt utilizing passive fire protection methods, such as space separation and non-combustible building materials, after a catastrophic fire. The discipline of fire engineering emerged in the early 20th century as a distinct discipline, separate from civil, mechanical and chemical engineering, in response to new fire problems posed by the Industrial Revolution. Another motivation to organize the discipline, define practices and conduct research to support innovations was in response to the catastrophic conflagrations and mass urban fires that swept many major cities during the latter half of the 19th century (see city or area fires). The insurance industry also helped promote advancements in the fire engineering profession and the development of fire protection systems and equipment.

In 1903 the first degree program in fire protection engineering was initiated as the Armour Institute of Technology (later becoming part of the Illinois Institute of Technology).

Early in the 20th century, several catastrophic fires resulted in changes to regulations and buildings codes to better protect people and property from fire.

== Education ==
Fire engineers, like their counterparts in other engineering and scientific disciplines, undertake a formal course of education and continuing professional development to acquire and maintain their competence. This education typically includes foundation studies in mathematics, physics, chemistry, and technical writing. Professional engineering studies focus students on acquiring proficiency in material science, statics, dynamics, thermodynamics, fluid dynamics, heat transfer, engineering economics, ethics, systems in engineering, reliability, and environmental psychology. Studies in combustion, probabilistic risk assessment or risk management, the design of fire suppression systems, fire alarm systems, building fire safety, and the application and interpretation of model building codes, and the measurement and simulation of fire phenomena complete most curricula.

New Zealand was one of the first countries in the world to introduce performance based assessment methods into their building codes in regard to fire safety. This occurred with the introduction of their 1991 Building Act. Professor Andy Buchanan, of the University of Canterbury, established the first post graduate and only course available in New Zealand, at the time, in fire safety engineering in 1995. Applicants to the course require a minimum qualification of a bachelor's degree in engineering or bachelor's degree in a limited list of science course. Notable alumni from the university of Canterbury include Sir Ernest Rutherford, Robert (Bob) Park, Roy Kerr, Michael P. Collins, and John Britten. A master's degree in fire engineering from the University of Canterbury is recognized under the Washington Accord.

In the United States, the University of Maryland (UMD) offers the ABET-accredited B.S. degree program in Fire Protection Engineering, as well as graduate degrees and a distance M.Eng. program. Worcester Polytechnic Institute (WPI) offers an M.S. and a Ph.D. in Fire Protection Engineering as well as online graduate programs in this discipline (M.S. and a Graduate Certificate). As of 2011, Cal Poly offers an M.S. in Fire Protection Engineering. Oklahoma State University offers an ABET-accredited B.S. in Fire Protection and Safety Engineering Technology (established in 1937), Eastern Kentucky University also offers an ABET-accredited B.S. in Fire Protection and Safety Engineering Technology, the Case School of Engineering at Case Western Reserve University offers a master's degree track in Fire Science and Engineering, University of New Haven offers a B.S. in Fire Protection Engineering, and the University of Cincinnati offers an associate degree in Fire Science and a bachelor's degree in Fire and Safety Engineering Technology as distance learning options, the only university in the U.S. and Canada to hold this distinction.

Canada has fire engineering programs at York University and the University of Waterloo.

Final design of fire sprinkler systems and hydraulic calculations is commonly performed by design technicians who are often educated in-house at contracting firms throughout North America, with the objective of preparing designers for certification by testing by associations such as NICET (National Institute for Certification in Engineering Technologies). NICET certification is commonly used as a proof of competency for securing a license to design and install fire protection systems.

In Europe, the University of Edinburgh offers a degree in Fire Engineering and had its first fire research group in the 1970s. These activities are now conducted at the new BRE Centre for Fire Safety Engineering. The University of Leeds uniquely offers an MSc award in Fire and Explosion Engineering.

Other European Universities active in fire engineering are:

- Ghent University
- Imperial College London
- Letterkenny Institute of Technology
- Linnaeus University
- Luleå University of Technology
- London South Bank University
- Lund University
- Norwegian University of Science
- Otto-von-Guericke-Universität Magdeburg
- Stord/Haugesund University College
- University of Applied Sciences Cologne
- University of Cantabria
- University of Central Lancashire
- University of Greenwich
- University of Manchester
- University of Poitiers
- University of Sheffield
- University of Ulster
- University of Wales (Newport)
- University of Warwick
- Glasgow Caledonian University
- Vilnius Gediminas Technikal University

The University of Ulster introduced its first fire safety programmes in 1975, followed by the first MSc Programme in Fire Safety Engineering in the United Kingdom introduced in 1990. In 2005 this MSc Programme will celebrate 25 years of unbroken service to higher fire safety engineering education. In 2004 the Institute for Fire Safety Engineering and Technology at the University of Ulster FireSERT occupied its new fire safety engineering laboratories which were funded by £6 million pound Infrastructure Award. The new facilities are state of the art fire safety engineering laboratories including a large scale burn hall and a 10-megawatt calorimeter.

In Australia, Victoria University in Melbourne offers postgraduate courses in Building Fire Safety and Risk Engineering as does the University of Western Sydney. The Centre for Environmental Safety and Risk Engineering (CESARE) is a research unit under Victoria University and has facilities for research and testing of fire behaviour. The Charles Darwin University and the University of Queensland have active programs.

Asian universities active in fire engineering include: Hong Kong Polytechnic University, Tokyo University of Science, Toyohashi University of Technology, and the University of Science and Technology of China.

== Professional registration ==
Suitably qualified and experienced fire protection engineers may qualify for registration as a professional engineer. The recognition of fire protection engineering as a separate discipline varies from state to state in the United States. The National Council of Examiners for Engineering and Surveying (NCEES) recognizes Fire Protection Engineering as a separate discipline and offers a PE exam subject. This test was last updated for the October 2012 exam and includes the following major topics (percentages indicate approximate weight of topic):

- Fire Protection Analysis (20%)
- Fire Protection Management (5%)
- Fire Dynamics (12.5%)
- Active and Passive Systems (50%)
- Egress and Occupant Movement (12.5%)

Few countries outside the United States regulate the professional practice of fire protection engineering as a discipline, although they may restrict the use of the title 'engineer' in association with its practice.

The titles 'fire engineer' and 'fire safety engineer' tend to be preferred outside the United States, especially in the United Kingdom and Commonwealth countries influenced by the British fire service.

The Institution of Fire Engineers is one international organization that qualifies many aspects of the training and qualifications of fire engineers and has the power to offer chartered status.

== See also ==
- Architecture
- Architectural engineering
- Building services engineering
- Fire test
- Institution of Fire Engineers
- Listing and approval use and compliance
- Product certification

=== Industry organizations ===
- Institution of Fire Engineers (IFE)
- National Fire Protection Association (NFPA)
- Society of Fire Protection Engineers (SFPE)
