= Fire sprinkler system =

Fire protection method

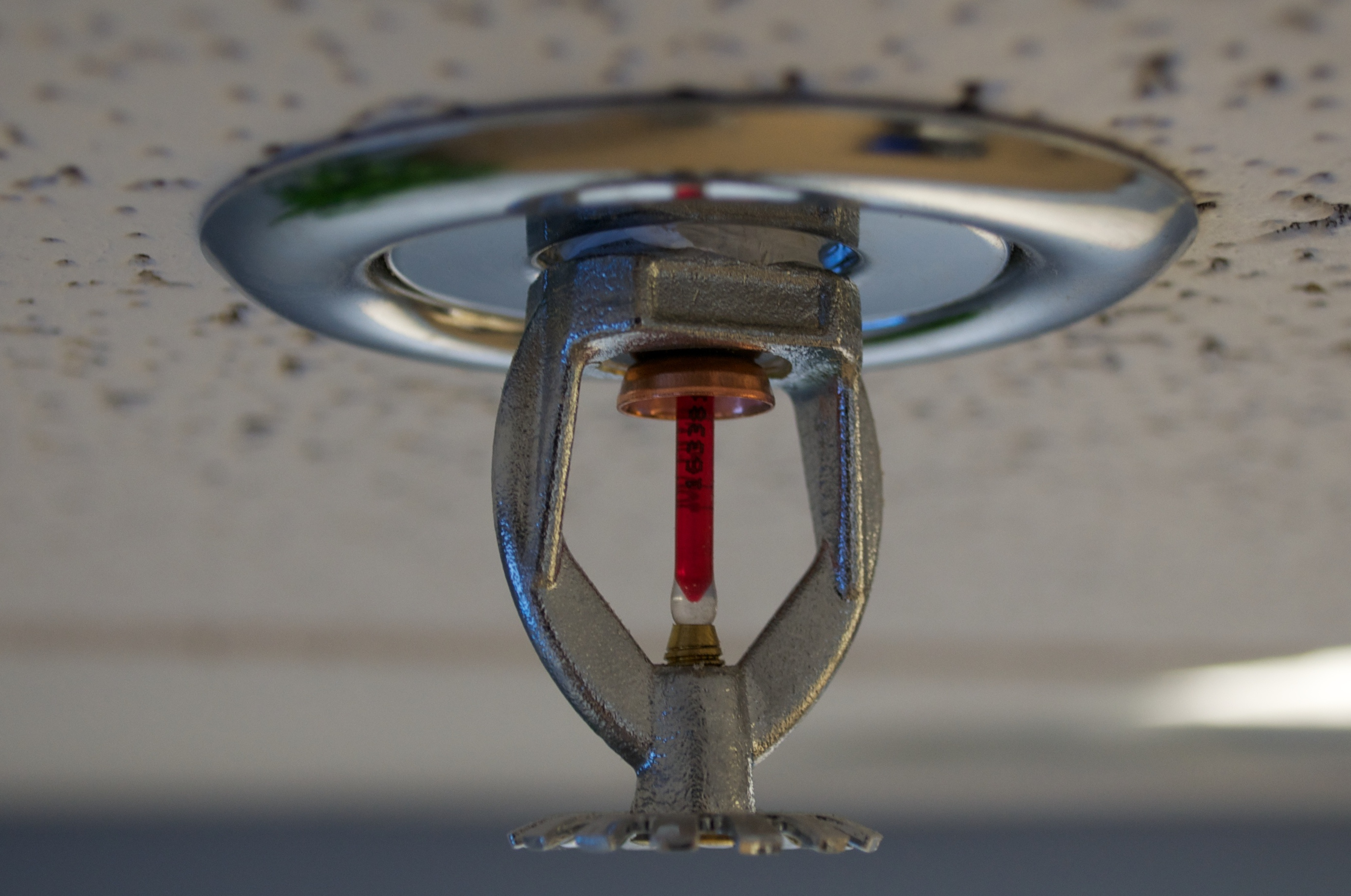
A glass bulb type sprinkler head will spray water into the room if sufficient heat reaches the bulb and causes it to shatter. Sprinkler heads operate individually. Note the red liquid in the glass bulb.

A fire sprinkler system is an active fire protection method, consisting of a water supply system providing adequate pressure and flowrate to a water distribution piping system, to which fire sprinklers are connected. Although initially used only in factories and large commercial buildings, systems for homes and small buildings are now in use.

Fire sprinkler systems are extensively used worldwide, with over 40 million sprinkler heads fitted each year. Fire sprinkler systems are generally designed as a life saving system, but are not necessarily designed to protect the building. Of buildings completely protected by fire sprinkler systems, if a fire did initiate, it was controlled by the fire sprinklers alone in 96% of these cases.

== History ==
Leonardo da Vinci designed a sprinkler system in the 15th century. He automated his patron's kitchen with a super-oven and a system of conveyor belts. During a large banquet, a fire broke out. It was concluded that, "The sprinkler system worked all too well, causing a flood that washed away all the food and a good part of the kitchen."

Ambrose Godfrey created the first successful automated sprinkler system in 1723. He used gunpowder to release a tank of extinguishing fluid.

Frederick Grinnell improved Henry S. Parmalee's design and in 1881 patented the automatic sprinkler that bears his name. He continued to improve the device and in 1890 invented the glass disc sprinkler, essentially the same as that in use today.

Until the 1940s, sprinklers were installed almost exclusively for the protection of commercial buildings, whose owners were generally able to recoup their expenses with savings in insurance costs. Over the years, fire sprinklers have become mandatory safety equipment" in some parts of North America, in certain occupancies, including, but not limited to newly constructed "hospitals, schools, hotels and other public buildings", subject to the local building codes and enforcement. However, outside of the US and Canada, sprinklers have rarely been mandated by building codes for normal hazard occupancies which do not have large numbers of occupants (e.g. factories, process lines, retail outlets, petrol stations, etc.)

Sprinklers are now commonly installed in non-industrial buildings, including schools and residential premises. This is largely as a result of lobbying by the National Fire Sprinkler Network, the European Fire Sprinkler Network, and the British Automatic Fire Sprinkler Association.

== Usage ==
Sprinklers have been in use in the United States since 1874, and were installed in factory applications where fires at the turn of the century were often catastrophic in terms of both human and property losses.

Sprinklers may be required to be installed by building codes, or may be recommended by insurance companies to reduce potential property losses or business interruption. US building codes for places of assembly (generally over 100 persons) and places with overnight sleeping accommodation such as hotels, nursing homes, dormitories, and hospitals, usually require sprinklers either under local building codes, as a condition of receiving State and Federal funding, or as a requirement to obtain certification (essential for institutions who wish to train medical staff).

== Regulations ==
=== United States ===
The primary fire code writing organization is the private National Fire Protection Association (NFPA). NFPA sets the standards for technical aspects of sprinklers installed in the US. Building codes, which specify which buildings require sprinklers are generally left to local jurisdictions. However, there are some exceptions:

In 1990 the US passed PL-101-391, better known as the Hotel and Motel Fire Safety Act of 1990. This law requires that any hotel, meeting hall, or similar institution that receives federal funds (i.e. for overnight stay, or a conference, etc.), must meet fire and other safety requirements. The most visible of these conditions is the implementation of sprinklers. As more and more hotels and other public accommodations upgraded their facilities to enable business with government visitors, this type of construction became the de facto industry norm – even when not directly mandated by any local building codes.

If building codes do not explicitly mandate the use of fire sprinklers, the code often makes it highly advantageous to install them as an optional system. Most US building codes allow for less-expensive construction materials, larger floor area limitations, longer egress paths, and fewer requirements for fire-rated construction in structures which are protected by fire sprinklers. Consequently, the total building cost is often decreased by installing a sprinkler system and saving money in the other aspects of the project, as compared to building a non-sprinklered structure.

In 2011, Pennsylvania and California became the first US states to require sprinkler systems in all new residential construction. However, Pennsylvania repealed the law later that same year. Many municipalities now require residential sprinklers, even if they are not required at the state level.

=== Europe ===
Renewed interest in and support for sprinkler systems in the UK has resulted in sprinkler systems being more widely installed. In schools, for example, the government has issued recommendations through Building Bulletin 100, a design guide for fire safety in schools, that most new schools, except for a few low risk schools, should be constructed with sprinkler protection. In 2011, Wales became the first country in the world where sprinklers are compulsory in all new homes. The law applies to newly built houses and blocks of flats, as well as care homes and university halls of residence. In Scotland, all new schools are sprinklered, as are new care homes, sheltered housing and high rise flats.

In the UK, since the 1990s sprinklers have gained recognition within the Building Regulations (England and Wales) and Scottish Building Standards and under certain circumstances, the presence of sprinkler systems is deemed to provide a form of alternative compliance to some parts of the codes. For example, the presence of a sprinkler system will usually permit doubling of compartment sizes and increases in travel distances (to fire exits) as well as allowing a reduction in the fire rating of internal compartment walls.

== Operation ==
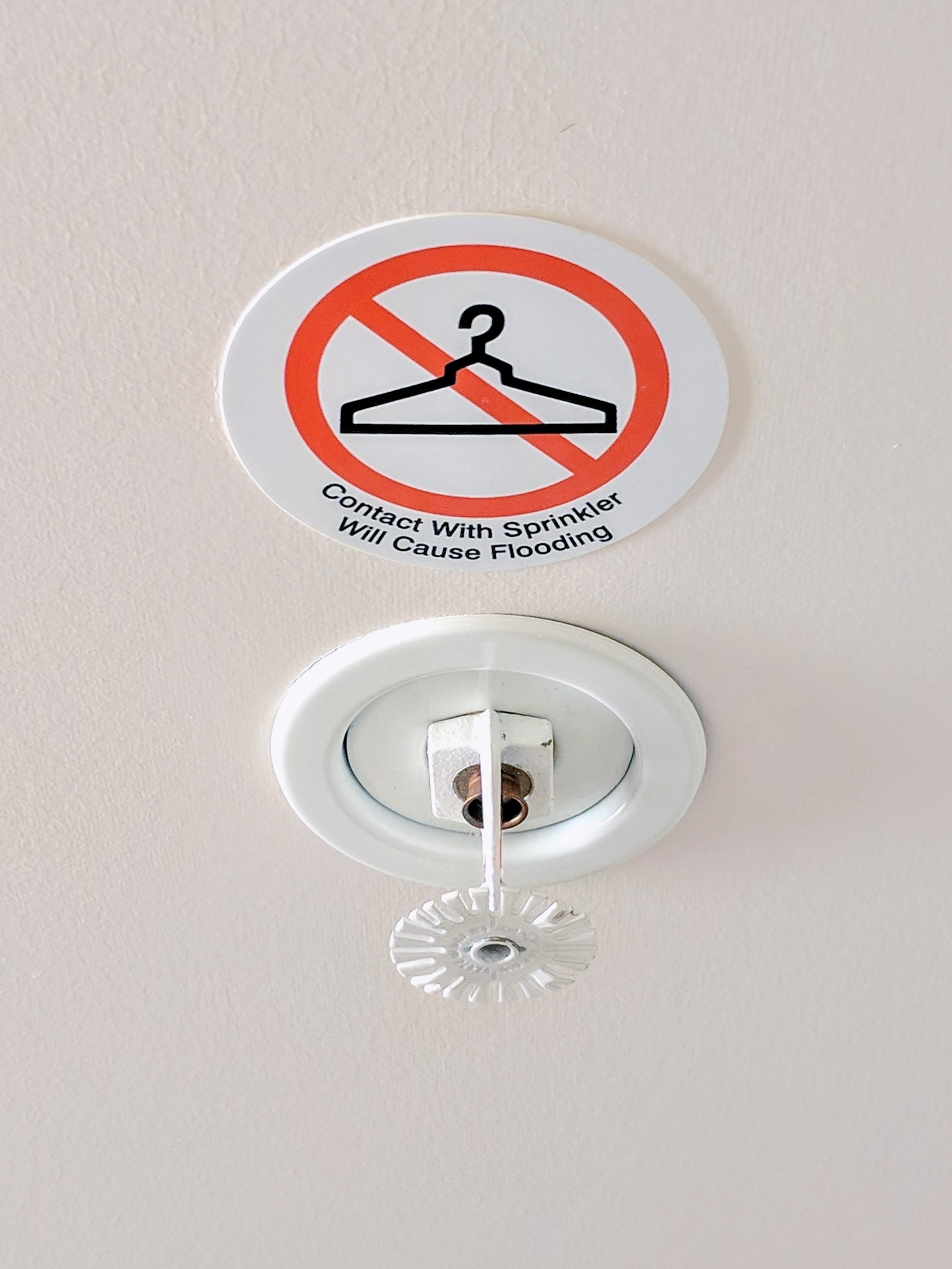
A sign warns hotel guests not to hang items from fire sprinklers

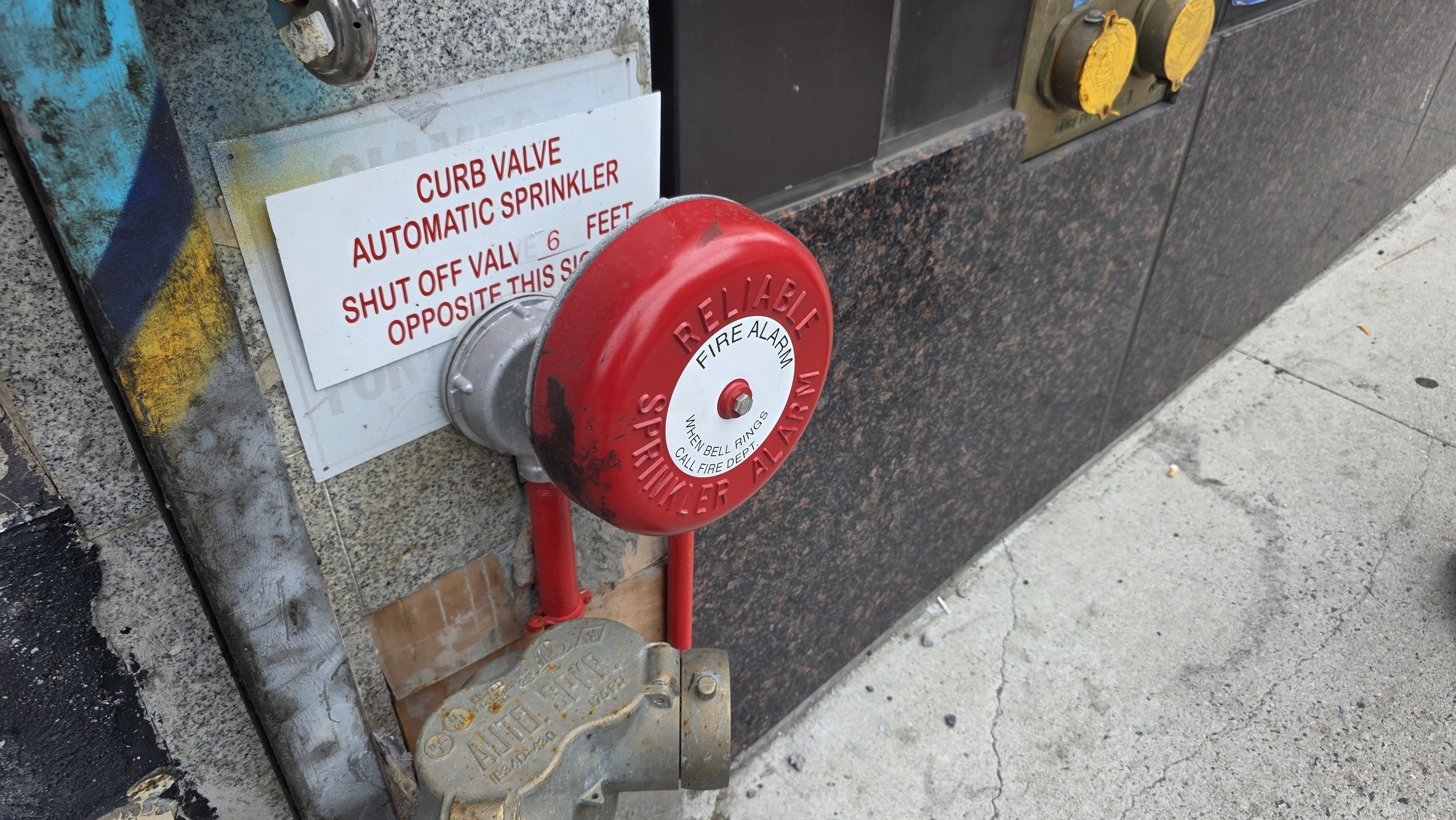
An exterior sprinkler alarm in the Flushing Chinatown in Queens, New York City.

Each closed-head sprinkler is held closed by either a heat-sensitive glass bulb or a two-part metal link held together with fusible alloy. The glass bulb or link hold in place a "pip cap" which acts as a plug to prevent water from flowing, unless the ambient temperature around the sprinkler reaches the design activation temperature of the individual sprinkler head. In a standard wet-pipe sprinkler system, each sprinkler activates independently when the predetermined heat level is reached. Thus, only the sprinklers sufficiently heated from the fire will operate. This maximizes water pressure over the point of fire origin, and minimizes water damage to the building.

Many systems have a water flow alarm near the fire department connection pipe This is used to guide the fire department to the fire department connection pipe, as well as alert those who are not in the building that a sprinkler has been activated, and there is a possibility of a fire in the building. Although interior fire alarm notification appliances in modern systems are electronic horns, bells are regularly used for water flow alarms, as they can be powered purely by water flowing through the pipe rather than an electronic signal.

A sprinkler activation will usually do less water damage than a fire department hose stream (which provide approximately 900 litres/min (250 US gallons/min). A typical sprinkler used for industrial manufacturing occupancies discharges about 75–150 litres/min (20–40 US gallons/min). However, a typical Early Suppression Fast Response (ESFR) sprinkler at a pressure of 50 psi (340 kPa) will discharge approximately 380 litres per minute (100 US gal/min).

In addition, a sprinkler will usually activate within one to four minutes of the fire's start, whereas it typically takes at least five minutes for a fire department to register an alarm and drive to the fire site, and an additional ten minutes to set up equipment and apply hose streams to the fire. This additional time can result in a much larger fire, requiring much more water to extinguish.

== Types ==
Fire sprinkler control valve assembly

=== Wet pipe ===
Wet pipe sprinkler systems are installed more often than other types of fire sprinkler systems. They also are the most reliable, because they are simple, with the only operating components being the automatic sprinklers and (commonly, but not always) the automatic alarm check valve. An automatic water supply provides water under pressure to the system piping.

Wet systems have optionally been charged with an antifreeze chemical, for use where pipes cannot reliably be kept above 40 °F (4 °C).

While such systems were once common in cold areas, after several fires which were not controlled because of sprinkler systems filled with too high a percentage of antifreeze, the regulatory authority in the United States effectively banned new antifreeze installations. A sunset date of 2022 applies to older antifreeze systems in the US. This regulatory action has greatly increased costs and reduced options for cold weather tolerant sprinkler systems.

=== Dry pipe ===
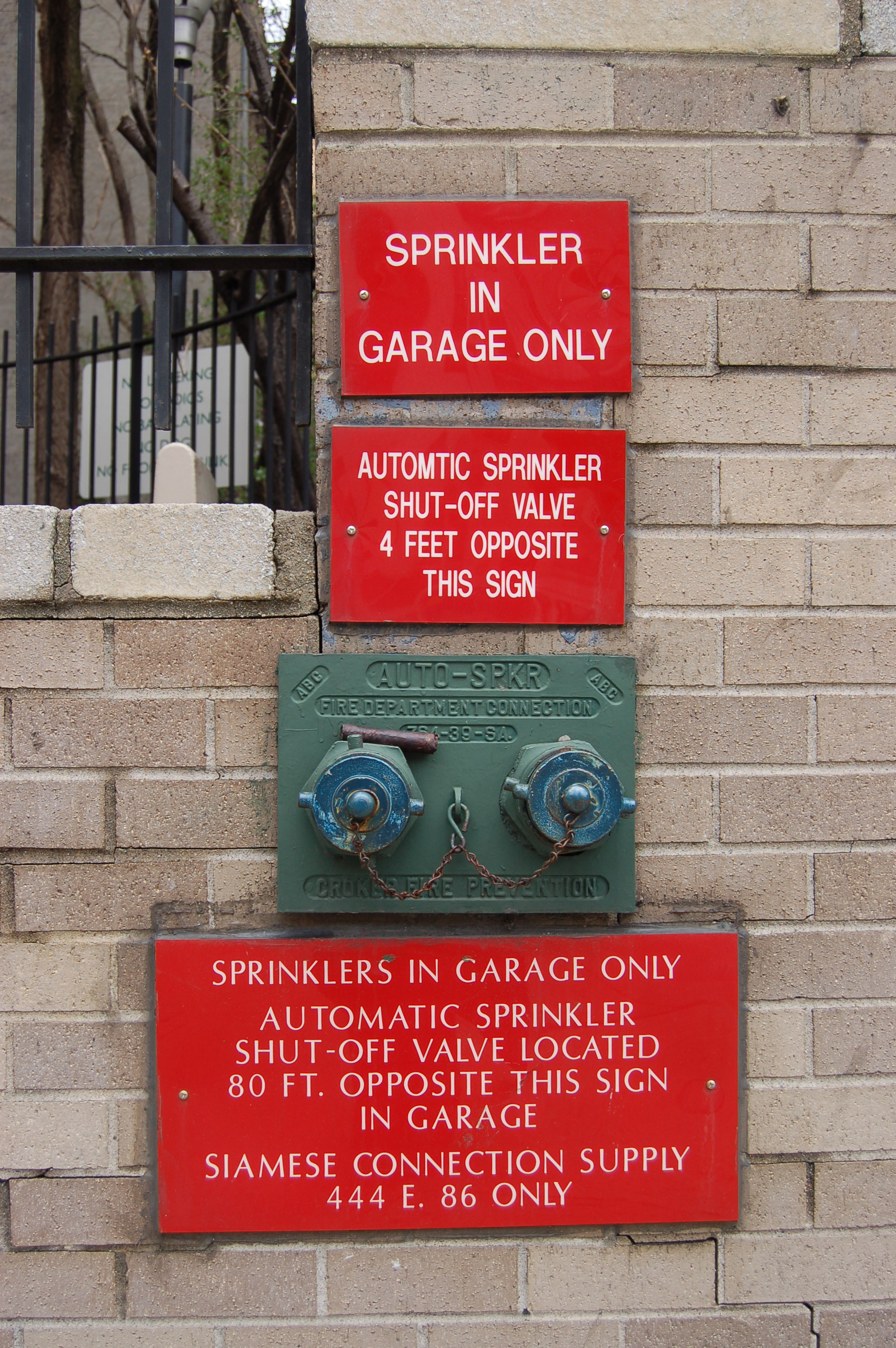
Garage sprinkler system and fire department connection in New York City

Dry pipe systems are the second most common sprinkler system type. Dry pipe systems are installed in spaces in which the ambient temperature may be cold enough to freeze the water in a wet pipe system, which would make the system inoperable. Dry pipe systems are most often used in unheated buildings, in parking garages, in outside canopies attached to heated buildings (within which a wet pipe system would also be provided), or in refrigerated coolers. In regions using NFPA regulations, wet pipe systems cannot be installed unless the range of ambient temperatures remains above 40 °F (4 °C).

Water is not present in the piping until the system operates; instead, the piping is filled with dry air at a pressure below the water supply pressure. To prevent the larger water supply pressure from prematurely forcing water into the piping, the design of the dry pipe valve (a specialized type of check valve) results in a greater force on top of the check valve clapper by the use of a larger valve clapper area exposed to the piping air pressure, as compared to the higher water pressure but smaller clapper surface area.

When one or more of the automatic sprinkler heads is triggered, it opens, allowing the air in the piping to vent from that sprinkler. Each sprinkler operates independently, as its temperature rises above its triggering threshold. As the air pressure in the piping drops, the pressure differential across the dry pipe valve changes, pushing the clapper open and allowing water to enter the piping system. Water flow from sprinklers, needed to control the fire, is delayed until the air is vented from the sprinklers. In regions using NFPA 13 regulations, the time it takes water to reach the hydraulically remote sprinkler from the time that sprinkler is activated is limited to a maximum of 60 seconds. In industry practice, this is known as the "Maximum Time of Water Delivery". The maximum time of water delivery may be required to be reduced, depending on the hazard classification of the area protected by the sprinkler system.

Disadvantages of using dry pipe fire sprinkler systems include:

- Increased complexity: Dry pipe systems require additional control equipment and air pressure supply components, which increases system complexity. This puts a premium on proper maintenance, as this increase in system complexity results in an inherently less-reliable overall system (i.e. more single failure points) as compared to a wet pipe system.
- Higher installation and maintenance costs: The added complexity impacts the overall dry-pipe installation cost, and increases maintenance expenditure including more frequent internal pipe inspections.
- Increased fire response time: Because the piping is empty at the time the sprinkler operates, there is an inherent time delay in delivering water to the sprinklers which have operated while the water travels from the riser to the sprinkler, partially filling the piping in the process. A maximum of 60 seconds is normally allowed by regulatory requirements from the time a single sprinkler opens until water is discharged onto the fire. This delay in fire suppression results in a larger fire prior to control, increasing property damage.

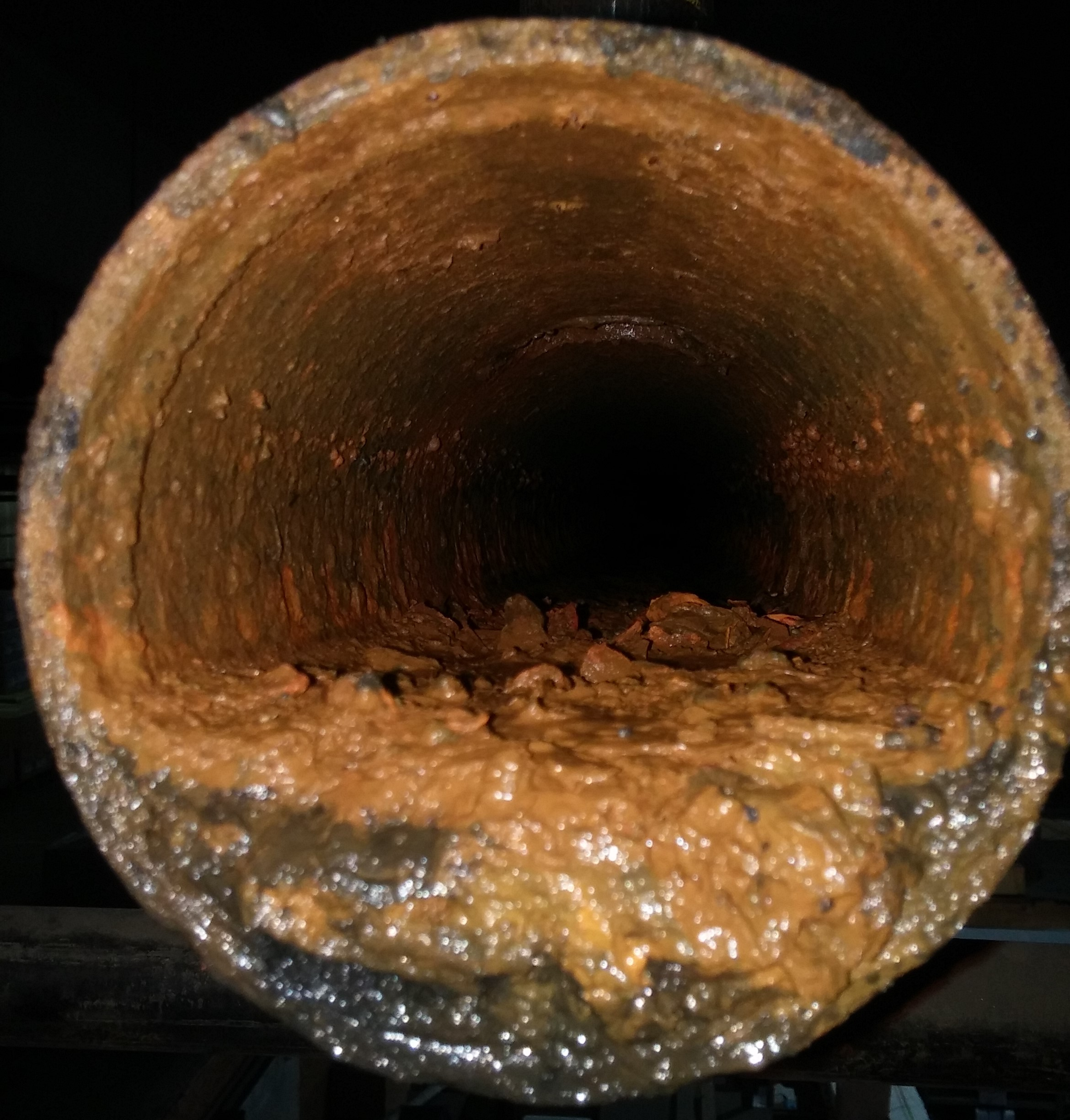
Dry pipe sprinkler system supply main with corrosion debris caused by oxidation

- Increased corrosion potential: Following operation or testing, dry-pipe sprinkler system piping should be drained, but residual water collects in piping low spots, and moisture is also retained in the atmosphere within the piping. This moisture, coupled with the oxygen available in the compressed air in the piping, increases internal pipe corrosion, eventually leading to pin-hole leaks or other piping failures. The internal corrosion rate in wet pipe systems (in which the piping is constantly full of water) is much lower, as the amount of oxygen available for the corrosion process is more limited. Corrosion can be combated by using galvanized, copper, or stainless steel pipe which are less susceptible to corrosion, or by using dry nitrogen gas to pressurize the system, rather than air. Nitrogen generators can be used as a permanent source of nitrogen gas, which is beneficial because dry pipe sprinkler systems require an uninterrupted supply of supervisory gas. These additional precautions can increase the up-front cost of the system, but will help prevent system failure, increased maintenance costs, and premature need for system replacement in the future.

=== Deluge ===
"Deluge" systems are systems in which all sprinklers connected to the water piping system are open, in that the heat sensing operating element is removed. These systems are used for special hazards where rapid fire spread is a concern, as they provide a simultaneous application of water over the entire hazard.

Water is not present in the piping until the system operates. Because the sprinkler orifices are open, the piping is at atmospheric pressure. To prevent the water supply pressure from forcing water into the piping, a "deluge valve" (a mechanically latched valve) is used in the water supply connection. It is a non-resetting valve, and stays open once tripped.

Because the heat sensing elements normally present in automatic sprinklers have been removed (resulting in open sprinkler heads), the deluge valve is opened via a signal from the fire alarm system which utilizes fire detectors. The type of fire alarm initiating device is selected mainly based on the hazard (e.g. pilot sprinklers, smoke detectors, heat detectors, or optical flame detectors). The initiation device signals the fire alarm panel, which in turn signals the deluge valve to open. Activation can also be via an electric or pneumatic fire alarm pull station which signals the fire alarm panel to signal the deluge valve to open.

=== Pre-action ===
Pre-action sprinkler systems are specialized for use in locations where accidental activation is especially undesirable, such as in museums with rare art works, manuscripts, or books; and data centers, for protection of computer equipment from accidental water discharge.

There are two main sub-types of pre-action systems: single interlock, and double interlock.

The operation of single interlock systems are similar to wet systems except that these systems require that a "preceding" fire detection event, typically the activation of a heat or smoke detector takes place prior to the "action" of water introduction into the system's piping by opening the pre-action valve which is a mechanically latched valve (i.e. similar to a deluge valve). In this way, the system is essentially converted from a dry system into a wet system. The intent is to reduce the undesirable time delay of water delivery to sprinklers that is inherent in dry systems. Prior to fire detection, if the sprinkler operates, or the piping system develops a leak, loss of air pressure in the piping will activate a trouble alarm. In this case, the pre-action valve will not open due to loss of supervisory pressure, and water will not enter the piping.

Double interlock systems require that both activation of a heat or smoke detector, and an automatic sprinkler operation take place prior to the "action" of water introduction into the system's piping. Activation of either the fire detectors alone, or sprinklers alone, without the concurrent operation of the other will not allow water to enter the piping. Because water does not enter the piping until a sprinkler operates, double interlock systems are considered as dry systems in terms of water delivery times, and similarly require a larger design area.

=== Foam water ===
A foam water fire sprinkler system is a special application system, discharging a mixture of water and low expansion foam concentrate, resulting in a foam spray from the sprinkler. These systems are usually used with special hazards occupancies associated with high challenge fires, such as flammable liquids, such as in aircraft hangars.

=== Water spray ===
"Water spray" systems are operationally identical to a deluge system, but the piping and discharge nozzle spray patterns are designed to protect a uniquely configured hazard, usually being three-dimensional components or equipment (i.e. as opposed to a deluge system, which is designed to cover the horizontal floor area of a room). The nozzles used may not be listed fire sprinklers, and are usually selected for a specific spray pattern to conform to the three-dimensional nature of the hazard (e.g. typical spray patterns being oval, fan, full circle, narrow jet). Examples of hazards protected by water spray systems are electrical transformers containing oil for cooling or turbo-generator bearings. Water spray systems can also be used externally on the surfaces of tanks containing flammable liquids or gases (such as hydrogen). Here the water spray is intended to cool the tank and its contents to prevent tank rupture/explosion (BLEVE) and fire spread.

=== Water mist ===
Water mist systems are used for special hazards applications. This type of system is typically used where water damage may be a concern, or where water supplies are limited. NFPA 750 defines water mist as a water spray with a droplet size of "less than 1000 microns at the minimum operation pressure of the discharge nozzle". The droplet size can be controlled by adjusting the discharge pressure through a nozzle of a fixed orifice size. The fire suppression mechanisms provided by water mist systems include cooling, local flame oxygen reduction, and radiation blocking.

In operation, water mist systems can operate with the same functionality as deluge, wet pipe, dry pipe, or pre-action systems. Systems can be applied using local application method or total flooding method, similar to Clean Agent Fire Protection Systems.

== Valves ==
Major control and isolation valves in traditional fire sprinkler systems are typically large gate valves of the "Outside Screw and Yoke" (OS&Y) type, sometimes called "rising stem" valves; or butterfly valves. The position (open or closed) of these valves can be determined visually. Alarm sensors may be attached to monitor the settings of these valves, which are critical to overall building safety.

== Design ==
Temperature		Color of liquid inside bulb
°C	°F	Color of liquid inside bulb
57	135	Orange
68	155	Red
79	174	Yellow
93	200	Green
141	286	Blue
182	360	Purple
227; 260	440; 500	Black
This chart from the fire safety standards indicates the color of the bulb and the respective operating temperature.

Sprinkler glass bulbs with different operating temperatures

Sprinkler systems are intended to either control the fire or to suppress the fire. Control mode sprinklers are intended to control the heat release rate of the fire to prevent building structure collapse, and pre-wet the surrounding combustibles to prevent fire spread. The fire is not extinguished until the burning combustibles are exhausted or manual extinguishment is effected by firefighters. Suppression mode sprinklers, also known as Early Suppression Fast Response (ESFR) sprinklers, are intended to result in a severe sudden reduction of the heat release rate of the fire, prior to manual intervention.

Control mode sprinkler systems are designed using an area and density approach. The building use and contents are analyzed to determine the level of fire hazard. The hazard is classified as light hazard, ordinary hazard group 1, ordinary hazard group 2, extra hazard group 1, or extra hazard group 2. After determining the hazard classification, a design area and density can be determined by referencing tables in the NFPA 13 standard. The design area represents the maximum area in which sprinklers are expected to operate before fire control is achieved. The design density is a measurement of how much water per square foot of floor area should be applied to the design area.

For example, in an office building classified as light hazard, a typical design area would be 1,500 square feet (140 m^{2}) and the design density would be 0.1 US gallons per minute (0.38 L/min) per 1 square foot (0.093 m^{2}) or a minimum of 150 US gallons per minute (570 L/min) applied over the 1,500-square-foot (140 m^{2}) design area. Another example would be a manufacturing facility classified as ordinary hazard group 2 where a typical design area would be 1,500 square feet (140 m^{2}) and the design density would be 0.2 US gallons per minute (0.76 L/min) per 1 square foot (0.093 m^{2}) or a minimum of 300 US gallons per minute (1,100 L/min) applied over the 1,500-square-foot (140 m^{2}) design area.

After the design area and density have been determined, calculations are performed to prove that the system can deliver the required amount of water over the required design area. These calculations account for all of the water pressure that is lost or gained between the water supply source and the sprinklers that would operate in the design area. This includes pressure losses due to friction inside the piping and losses or gains due to elevational differences between the source and the discharging sprinklers. Sometimes momentum pressure from water velocity inside the piping is also calculated. Typically these calculations are performed using computer software, but before the advent of computer systems these sometimes complicated calculations were performed by hand. This skill of calculating sprinkler systems by hand is still required training for a sprinkler system design technologist who seeks senior level certification from engineering certification organizations such as the National Institute for Certification in Engineering Technologies (NICET).

Sprinkler systems in residential structures are becoming more common, as the cost of such systems becomes more practical and the benefits become more obvious. Residential sprinkler systems usually fall under a residential classification separate from the commercial classifications mentioned above. A commercial sprinkler system is designed primarily for property protection. Residential sprinkler systems are designed to control a fire for a sufficient time to allow for the safe escape of the building occupants. While these systems will often also protect the structure from major fire damage, this is a secondary consideration. In residential structures, sprinklers are often omitted from closets, bathrooms, balconies, garages and attics because a fire in these areas would not usually impact the occupant's escape route.

== Costs and effectiveness ==
In 2008, the installed costs of sprinkler systems ranged from US$0.31 – $3.66 per square foot, depending on type and location. Residential systems, installed at the time of initial home construction and utilizing municipal water supplies, average about US$0.35/square foot.

Systems can be installed during initial construction, or retrofitted. Some communities have laws requiring residential sprinkler systems, especially where large municipal hydrant water supplies ("fire flows") are not available. Nationwide in the United States, one and two-family homes generally do not require fire sprinkler systems, although the overwhelming loss of life due to fires occurs in these spaces. Residential sprinkler systems are inexpensive (about the same per square foot as carpeting or floor tiling), but require larger water supply piping than is normally installed in homes, so retrofitting is usually cost prohibitive.

The NFPA states that it "has no record of a fire killing more than two people in a completely sprinklered building where a sprinkler system was properly operating, except in an explosion or flash fire or where industrial fire brigade members or employees were killed during fire suppression operations." Elsewhere it has stated, "NFPA has no record of a multiple fatality in a fully sprinklered building where the system operated."

== See also ==
- Active fire protection
- Architectural engineering
- Fire protection
- Fire protection engineering
- Listing and approval use and compliance
- Passive fire protection
- Pipe support
- Sprinkler fitting
- Victaulic
