= Oklahoma State University College of Engineering, Architecture, and Technology =

Vocational school at Oklahoma State University

Coordinates: 36.1238°N 97.0683°W

The Oklahoma State University College of Engineering, Architecture, and Technology (or CEAT) serves as the engineering, architecture, and technology components of OSU-Stillwater in Stillwater, Oklahoma, and OSU-Tulsa in Tulsa, Oklahoma. and is the only combined Engineering, Architecture, and Technology college in the United States. The Advanced Technology Research Center (ATRC), a relatively new addition to the college, has worked with business and industry in the areas of web handling, energy storage and conversion, manufacturing and other fields.

The OSU College of Engineering, Architecture, and Technology was created in 1902, and is the largest and oldest college of engineering in Oklahoma today and has frequently been recognized as one of the best colleges in the nation. Oklahoma State's architecture students have won more national and international competitions than any school in the country. Students in the School of Mechanical and Aerospace Engineering have won more American Institute of Aeronautics and Astronautics Design/Build/Fly competitions than any other school, finishing in the top 3 17 times since the competition's inception, including 7 first place wins. The Congressional Fire Services Institute, an institution advising Congress on fire and safety matters, named OSU's International Fire Service Training Association/Fire Protection Publications as the 2005 Fire Service Organization of the Year . Researchers at Oklahoma State have developed two new body armor systems, giving soldiers added protection against injuries to their arms and legs while on the battlefield .

== Academic programs ==
- Aerospace Engineering
- Architecture
- Architectural Engineering
- Biosystems Engineering
- Chemical Engineering
- Civil Engineering
- Construction Engineering & Management
- Control Systems Engineering
- Electrical and Computer Engineering
- Electrical Engineering Technology
- Engineering and Technology Management
- Environmental Engineering
- Fire Protection and Safety Technology
- Geotechnical Engineering
- Health Care Administration
- Industrial Engineering and Management
- Mechanical Engineering
- Mechanical Engineering Technology
- Telecommunications management
- Transportation Engineering
