= Active fire protection =

Items and systems responding to fire

Active fire protection (AFP) is an integral part of fire protection. AFP is characterized by items and/or systems, which require a certain amount of motion and response in order to work, contrary to passive fire protection.

== Categories ==
=== Manual fire suppression ===
Manual fire suppression includes the use of a fire blanket, fire extinguisher, or a standpipe system.

==== Fire blanket ====
A fire blanket is a sheet of fire retardant material that is designed to be placed over a fire to smother it out. Small fire blankets are meant for inception stage fires. They are normally made of fiberglass or Kevlar. Larger ones can be found in laboratories and factories, and are designed to be wrapped around a person whose clothes have caught fire.

==== Fire extinguisher ====
Fire extinguishers are devices that contain and discharge a substance that extinguishes or puts out a fire. These handheld devices come in a huge range of sizes, but the most common are portable fire extinguishers, typically weighing up to 15 kg in total. These can be easily handled and operated by one person and placement can either be wall-mounted, on a fire extinguisher trolley or housed inside a cabinet. Fire extinguishers are one of the most common manual fire suppression devices and are required in all commercial buildings and vehicles. Fire extinguishers can be used with little to no training and are meant for small incipient stage fires. The most common extinguisher is the ABC extinguisher and are found in most offices and homes. It can be used on normal fires, liquid fires, and electrical fires. There are also special extinguishers for kitchen fires and for use on burning metals, those being Class K and Class D respectively.

==== Standpipe ====
Standpipes are installed in most large, multistory buildings. There are two types of standpipes: dry and wet. Most standpipes are dry systems and cannot be used by the public. Dry systems require a fire engine to pump water into the system. Most dry systems do not have pre-connected hoses and require firefighters to bring in the hose. In wet systems, there is always water in the pipes and they can be used by anyone. Wet systems will have hoses so building occupants can try and extinguish fires. Wet systems are becoming less common with the increase in number of sprinkler systems being installed. In some systems, firefighters have the option of pumping a Fire Department Connection (FDC) which will increase the water pressure at a standpipe in the event of a fire pump failure or loss of pressure. Typically, these systems pressurize the sprinkler system or the standpipe but not both at the same time.

=== Automatic fire suppression ===
Automatic control means are any form of suppression that requires no human intervention these can include a fire sprinkler system, a gaseous clean agent, or automatic foam suppression system. Most automatic suppression systems would be found in large commercial kitchens or other high-risk areas.

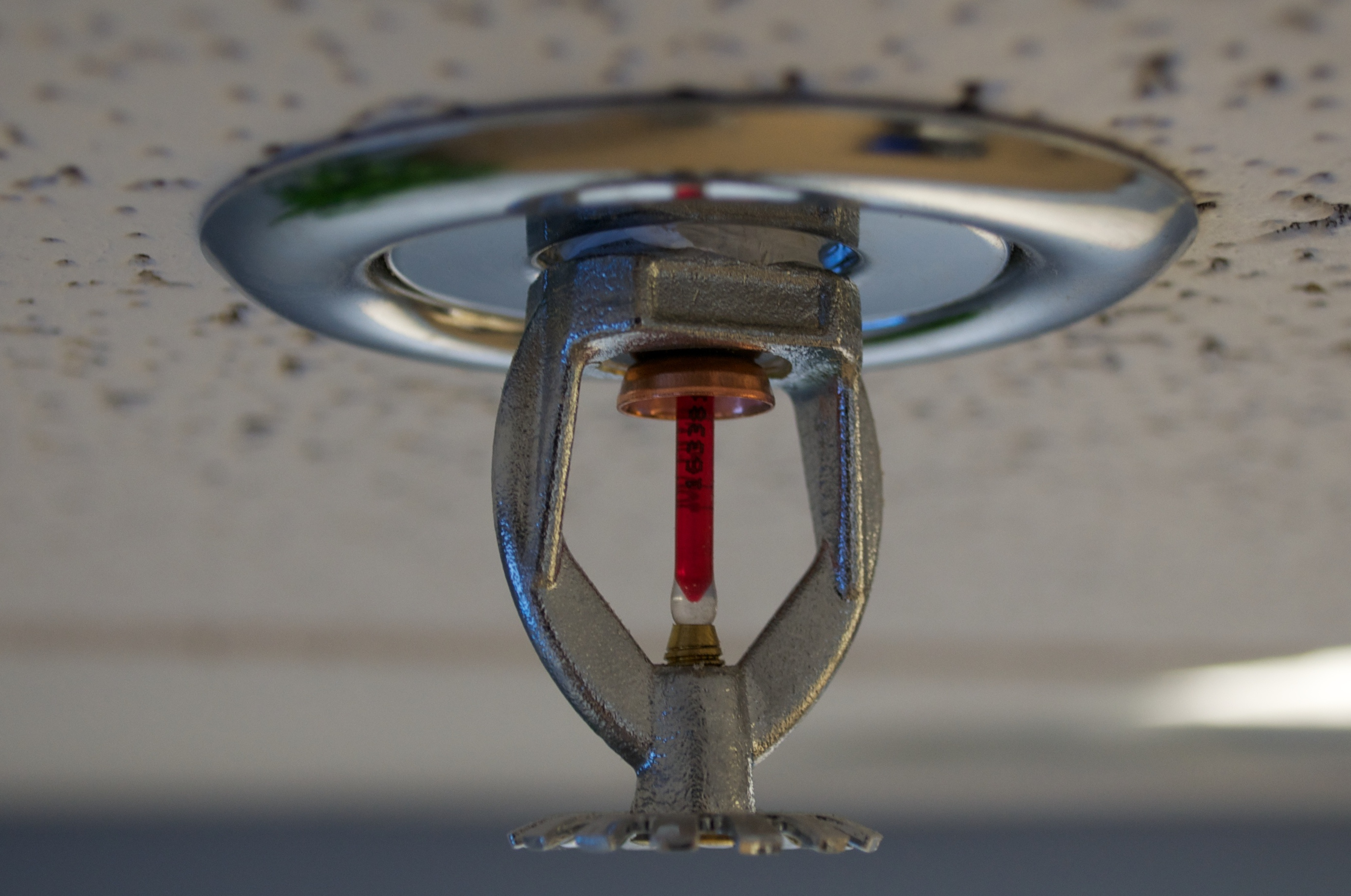
Sprinkler head. Heat causes the liquid in the bulb to expand, burst the glass and create an opening through which the water is released to control the fire.

==== Sprinkler systems ====
Fire sprinkler systems are installed in all types of buildings, commercial and residential. They are usually located at ceiling level and are connected to a reliable water source, most commonly municipal water supply. A typical automatic sprinkler system operates when heat at the site of a fire causes a fusible link or glass component in the sprinkler head to fail, thereby releasing the water from the sprinkler head. This means that only the sprinkler heads at the fire location actuate – not all the sprinklers on a floor or in a building. However, certain systems, such as deluge systems, do spray water from all heads in the same zone upon actuation. Sprinkler systems help to reduce the growth of a fire, thereby increasing life safety and limiting structural damage.

==== Gaseous clean agent ====
Gaseous clean agents are installed to result in less fire and water damage than sprinklers, such as in computer rooms. The system works by flooding an area with a gas which interferes with the fire tetrahedron. These systems are often found in areas where people are not going to be present when the system is activated such as datacenters, cooling systems, and other industrial applications. Activating a gaseous clean agent system when people are present can cause injury or death, and are usually equipped with an audible notification system to warn any potential occupants to evacuate the area.

==== Foam suppression system ====
Automatic foam suppression systems come in three main forms low expansion, medium expansion, and high expansion.

===== Low expansion =====
Low expansion foam expands less than 20 times its original size. These systems can be installed in a variety of places but are commonly found in places where hydrocarbons are stored. Low expansion foam systems when using film forming work by making a blanket of foam over the burning liquid to both cool it down and suppress the vapors.

===== Medium expansion =====
Medium expansion foam expands between 20 and 200 times its original size. These can be installed in outdoor settings like transfer stations or for use in open pits. Medium foam is used outdoors because it is denser than high expansion and will not blow away as easily. It works by covering what is on fire in a thick blanket of foam to smother it and suppress vapors.

===== High expansion =====
High expansion foam expands between 200 and 1000 times its original size. These systems are commonly installed in large volume areas like airplane hangars, mine shafts, and ship holds. These systems are normally installed inside and make a very light foam. They extinguish the fire by rapid smothering and cooling. Its rapid rate of expansion enables it to fill large areas with foam rapidly. When used on LNG tanks they provide an added insulation layer that helps reduce the vapor rate.

===== Electronically controlled =====
Nozzles that are powered by electrical energy that is generated and supplied by fire detection and control devices and are typically closed.

===== Ignitable liquid drainage floor assembly (ILDFA) =====
ILDFA uses a dual approach, combining a water-based fire suppression system in conjunction with a hollow, perforated flooring system to drain and remove spilled flammable liquid. This approach reduces the risk of pool fires inside infrastructure by diverting any leaked fuel away from potential ignition sources or by extinguishing any flammable liquid fire by depriving it of oxygen once it is removed.

== Fire detection ==
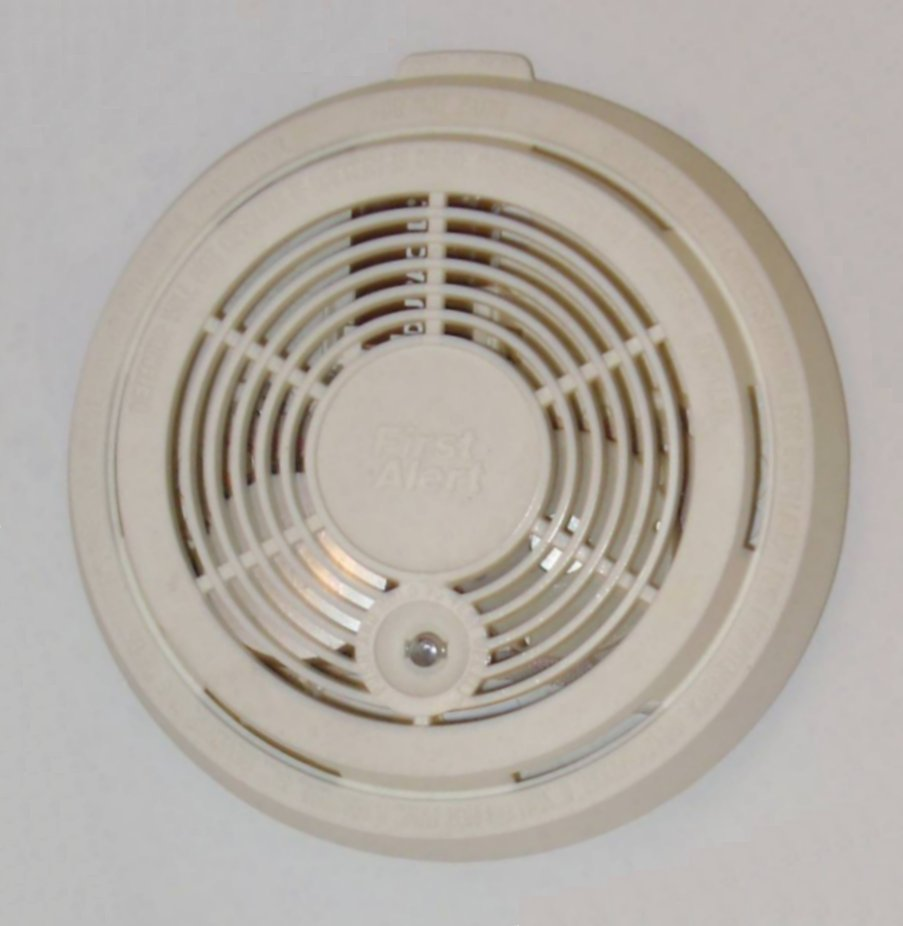
A common, residential smoke detector sounds an alarm when smoke is detected.

Fire detection works using smoke or heat sensors. These systems are very effective tool at alerting people in the immediate vicinity of where the fire is detected but building regulations require an integrated fire detection system. These system not only alerts people throughout the building by triggering the fire alarm but it can also summon emergency services. There are two types of systems available – addressable and conventional. Addressable systems monitor the specific location of each device (e.g. smoke detector, call point or sounder). It means in the event of a fire or other emergency you know exactly where the problem is. This saves precious time and helps the emergency services prevent the loss of life and serious damage. Conventional systems can only determine the problem is in a general area and thus are more suited for small sites.

When the fire detection system is activated it can also send an alert to the local fire department, broadcast a prerecorded warning message and unlock the buildings access control system.

== Hypoxic air fire prevention ==
Fire can be prevented by hypoxic air. Hypoxic air fire prevention systems, also known as oxygen reduction systems are new automatic fire prevention systems that permanently reduce the oxygen concentration inside the protected volumes so that ignition or fire spreading cannot occur. Unlike traditional fire suppression systems that usually extinguish fire after it is detected, hypoxic air is able to prevent fires. At lower altitudes hypoxic air is safe to breathe for healthy individuals.

== Construction and maintenance ==
All AFP systems are required to be installed and maintained in accordance with strict guidelines in order to maintain compliance with the local building code and the fire code.

AFP works alongside modern architectural designs and construction materials and fire safety education to prevent, retard, and suppress structural fires.

== See also ==
- Fire damper
- Fire hydrant
- Fire protection engineering
