= Hurricane evacuation =

Evacuation of people due to hurricanes

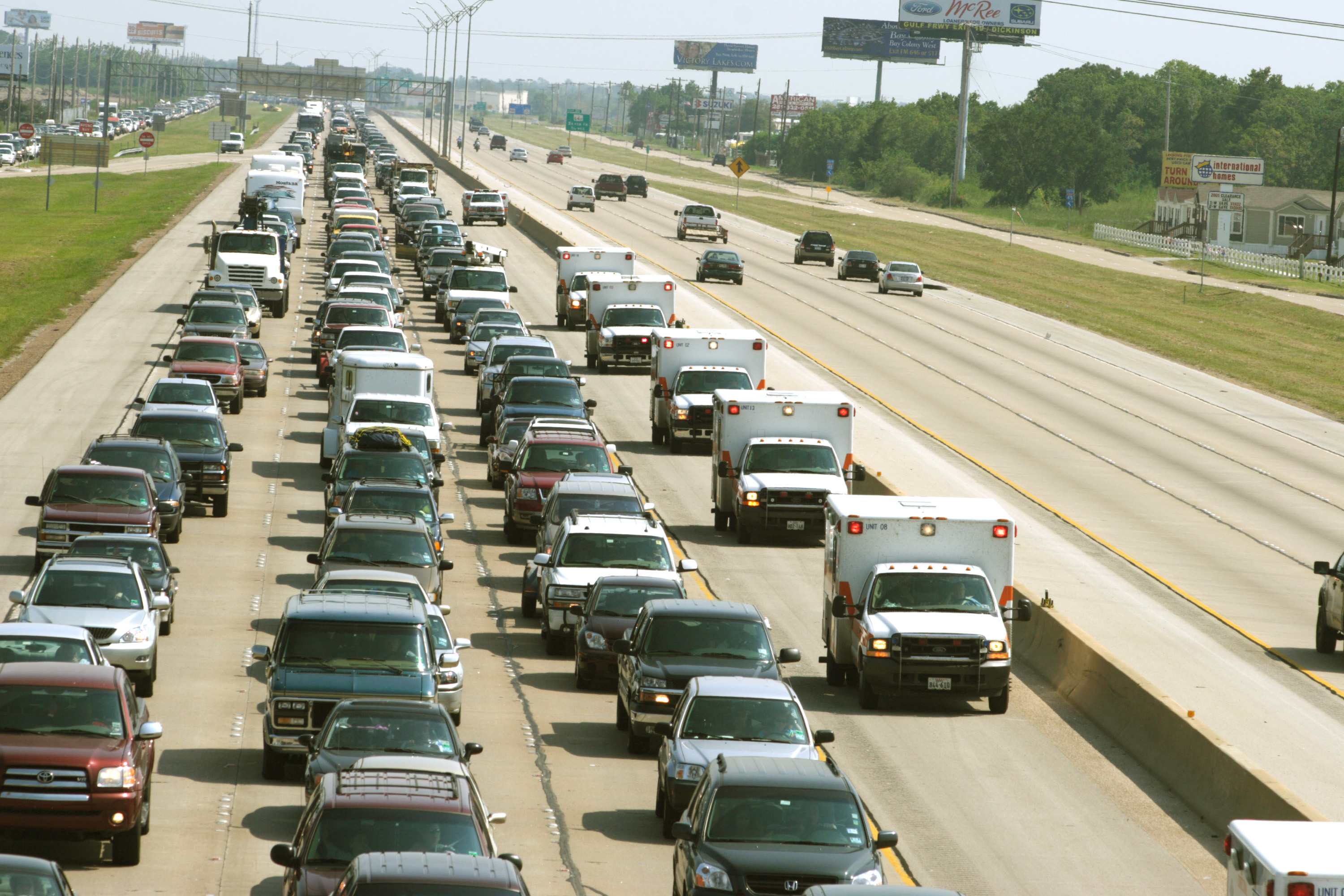
Evacuees on Interstate 45 leaving Galveston during Hurricane Rita in 2005.

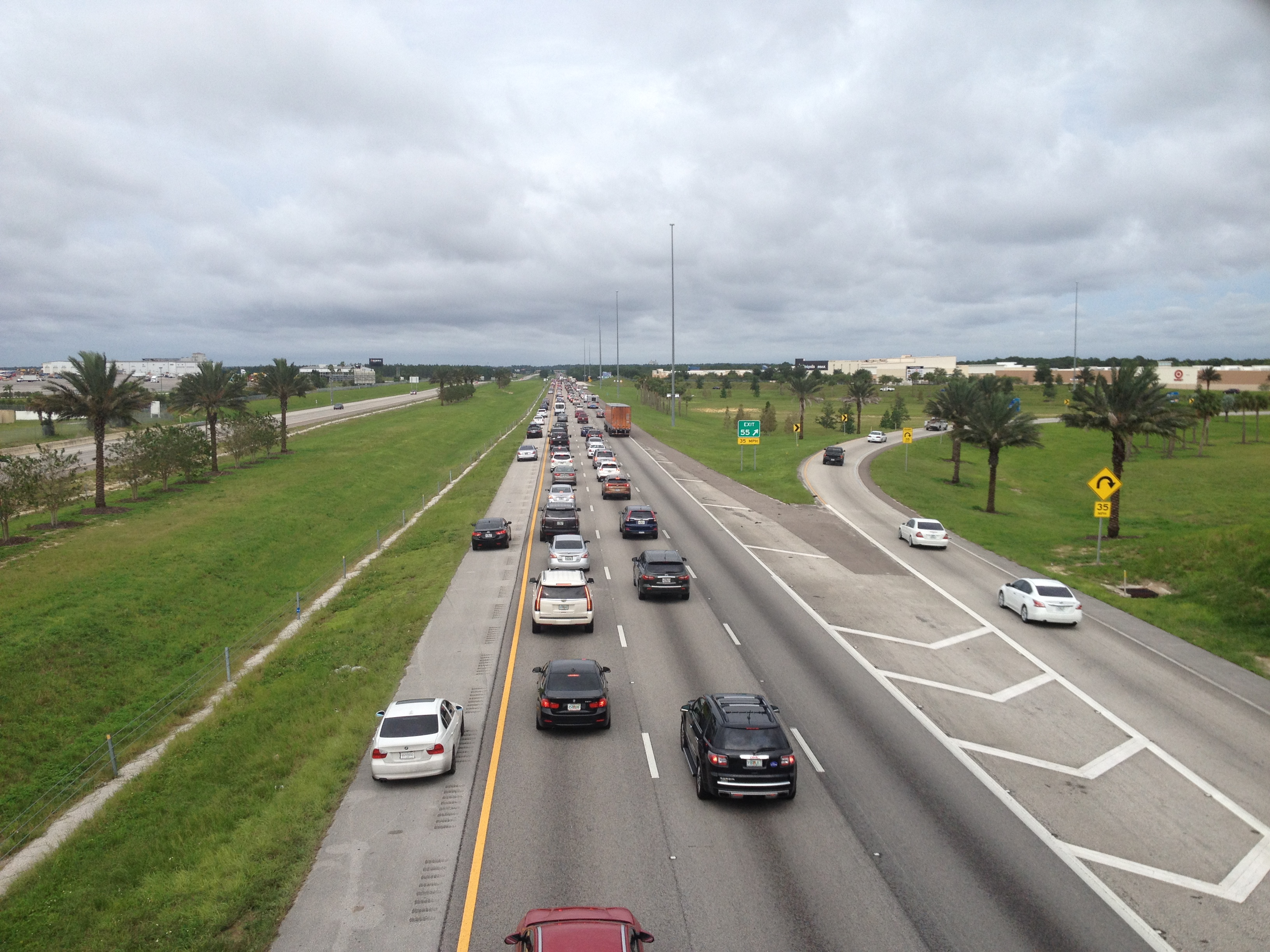
Evacuees on Interstate 4 leaving Florida's Gulf Coast during Hurricane Irma in 2017.

Hurricane evacuation is the immediate and rapid movement of people away from the threat or actual occurrence of a hurricane. County judges, emergency managers and other officials may recommend a voluntary evacuation or order a mandatory evacuation.

A "hurricane evacuation route" is a highway in the United States that is a specified route for hurricane evacuation. Despite mandatory evacuation orders some people still refuse to leave their homes.

== Evacuation ==
=== Determining whether evacuation is necessary ===
Due to the danger of hurricanes, evacuating should always be an option during strong hurricanes. Some residents may believe that due to the monetary cost of evacuation and the price of not being there to care for their home, evacuation is not a good choice. Due to the potential health and safety risks, authorities in some areas should give evacuation their meaningful consideration.

Hurricane evacuation can be vital to individual safety in some circumstances, including the following:

- past hurricanes have caused storm-surge damage
- the home is built on a floodplain
- living in a mobile home
- the home lacks hurricane structural reinforcement
- local officials recommend it

Officials advise that people who are not evacuating should carefully monitor severe weather updates provided by emergency broadcasting services, since the direction and potential danger of a hurricane may change suddenly.

=== Means ===
Private cars may not be an efficient means of evacuating. The traffic jams that thousands of motorists experienced in South Carolina while fleeing Hurricane Floyd and Texas while fleeing Hurricane Rita exemplify the frustration of people trying to evacuate. Some jurisdictions have implemented contraflow lane reversal plans in an attempt to increase outbound traffic capacity from coastal areas, but traffic jams still occur in these situations. Many buses and coaches in New Orleans can change their destination boards to "EVACUATION" in times of a hurricane, effectively doubling as ambulances.

Social capital refers to the connections between people: social networks and the reciprocity and trust within them. The social systems of communities can have a large impact on their ability and willingness to evacuate. Weak social networks within a community can make evacuation difficult. If people don't trust each other, then they are likely to fear that their homes or stores will be looted if they evacuate. Communities that have the physical capital, such as cars, to evacuate everyone may not have the social capital to facilitate sharing these resources. However, strong social networks within a community can also hinder evacuation by increasing the ties to the neighborhood and refusing to evacuate.

=== Shadow evacuation ===
There were an estimated 6.8 million Floridians who evacuated during Hurricane Irma, with some doing so twice. Subtle shifts in the storm's path first sent evacuees from the east to west coast of the state, and then north when Leon County ran out of hotel rooms and filled ten shelters with people, some of whom were from other parts of the state. Officials said 3 million of those evacuees were not actually in an evacuation zone. These "shadow evacuees" caused gridlock on Florida's Turnpike, which meant a 20-hour trek into Georgia as lines of cars escaped Florida, and state officials advised those not in an evacuation zone to stay home if they can next time because with the exception of mobile homes, evacuations in Florida are based on storm surge, not wind. This means people should evacuate tens of miles inland, not hundreds of miles north.

== Hurricane evacuation route ==
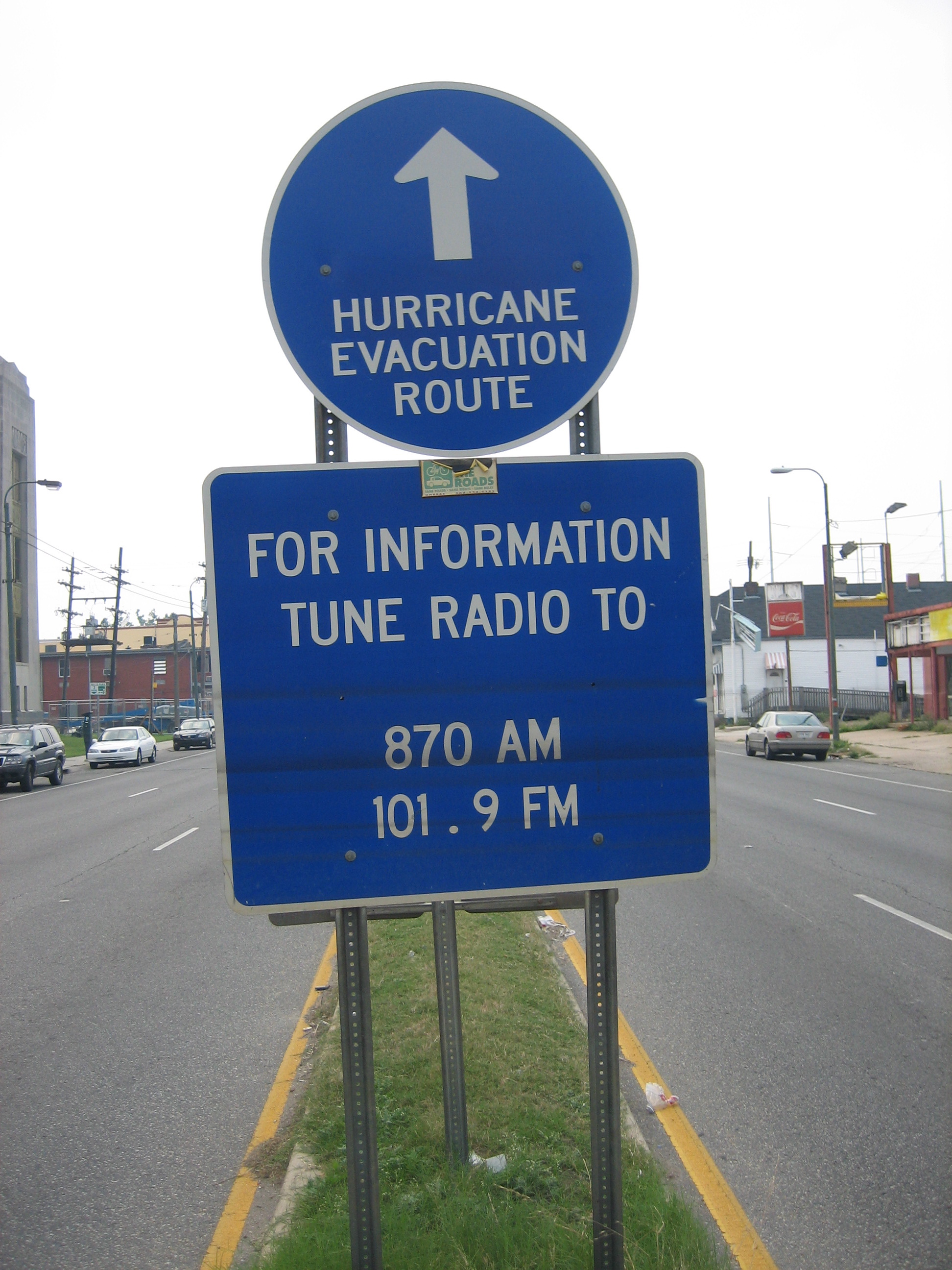
A hurricane evacuation route sign on Tulane Avenue in New Orleans, Louisiana, after Hurricane Katrina. The signage below suggests tuning to WWL Radio or sister station WLMG for emergency information.

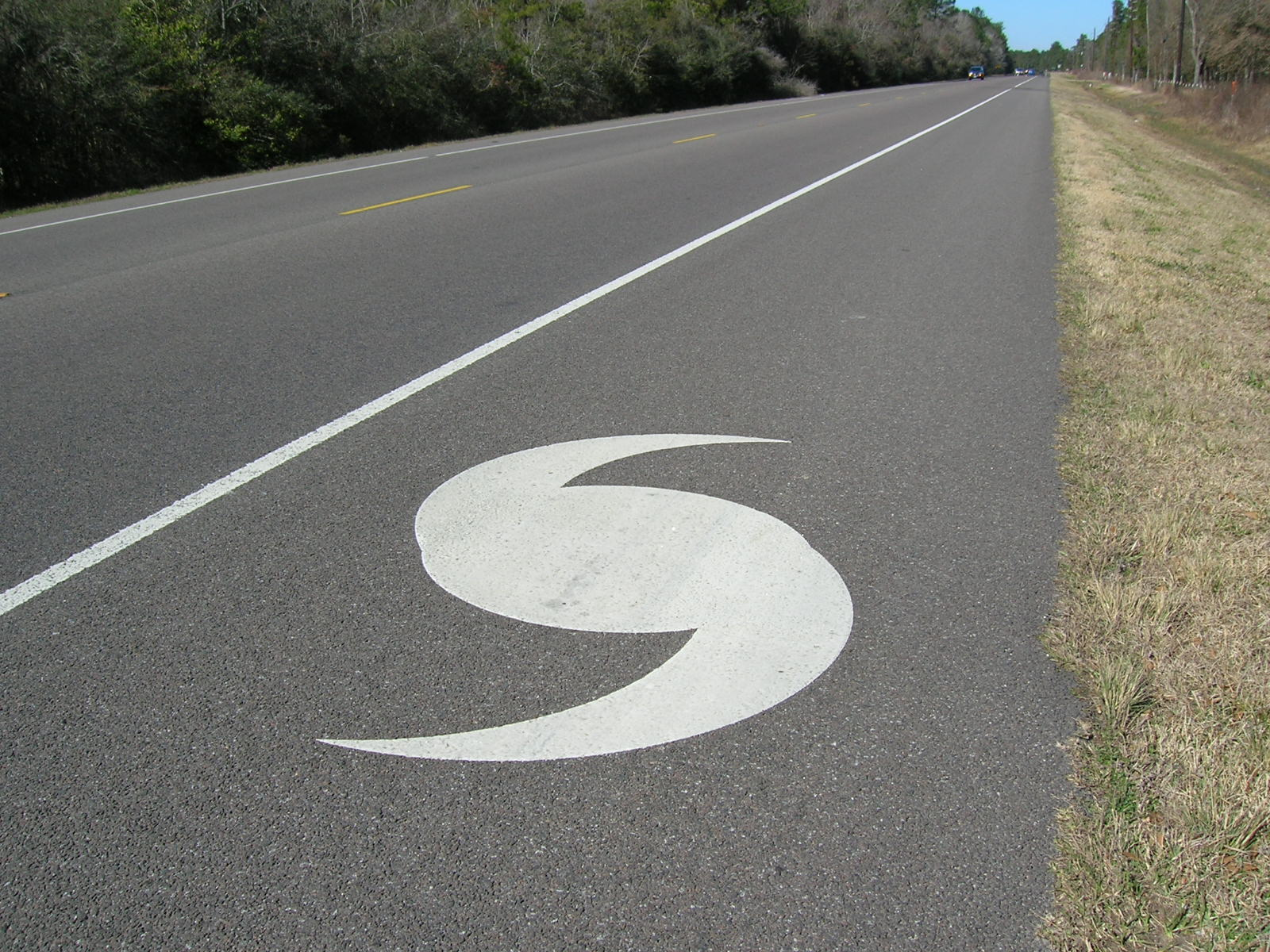
Hurricane evacuation route marking near the Texas Gulf Coast

A hurricane evacuation route (also called coastal evacuation route or evacuation route) is a highway in the United States that is a specified route for hurricane evacuation.

Along the Gulf Coast, hurricane evacuation routes lead north and west for up to hundreds of miles to the safest major city. Along the Atlantic Coast, routes lead west. They are marked with blue signs that point in the correct direction. During mass evacuations, these roads (and especially interstate highways) have been set up with paved crossover lanes so that both north and southbound lanes flow north and west and eastbound lanes flow west, a procedure known as contraflow. In some cases, traffic may still be backed up, bumper-to-bumper.

Every U.S. state bordering a marginal sea of the Atlantic Ocean primarily uses signed evacuation routes, with the exception of Connecticut, New Hampshire, and Rhode Island.

== Resistance to evacuating ==
The longer people have lived in a coastal area, the less likely they are to evacuate. Hurricanes have a longer warning time than most disasters, but details of strength and track are only educated guesses. Official warnings, as with other scenario planning, are based on a worst case, which is not the most probable case. Thus, hurricanes can be predicted to hit a coastal town many times without the town ever actually experiencing the brunt of a storm. When this more probable case happens a number of times, people tend to take evacuation orders less seriously.

If evacuation orders are given too early, the hurricane can change course and leave the evacuated area unscathed. People may think they have weathered hurricanes before, when in reality the hurricane didn't hit them directly, giving them false confidence. Those who have lived on the coast for ten or more years are the most resistant to evacuating.

Despite mandatory evacuation orders, many people did not leave New Orleans, as Hurricane Katrina approached. Even after the city was flooded and uninhabitable, some people still refused to leave their homes.

During Hurricane Helene, the sheriff of Taylor County, Florida, urged residents who chose not to evacuate to write their name, birthday, and important information on their arm or leg with a permanent marker for identification purposes.

== See also ==
- Civil defense
- Contraflow lane reversal
- Emergency evacuation
- Emergency management
- Evacuation process simulation
- List of mass evacuations
- Emergency airplane evacuation
- Shelter in place
- Vertical and horizontal evacuation

== Sources ==
- Abrahams, John: "Fire escape in difficult circumstances", chapter 6, In: Stollard, 1994, Design against fire.
- Gershenfeld, Neil, Mathematical Modelling. OUP, Oxford, 1999.
- Hubert Klüpfel, A Cellular Automaton Model for Crowd Movement and Egress Simulation. Dissertation, Universität Duisburg-Essen, 2003.
- Stollard, P. and L. Johnson, Eds., Design against fire: an introduction to fire safety engineering design, London, New York, 1994.
