= Emergency evacuation =

Urgent removal of people from an area of imminent or ongoing threat

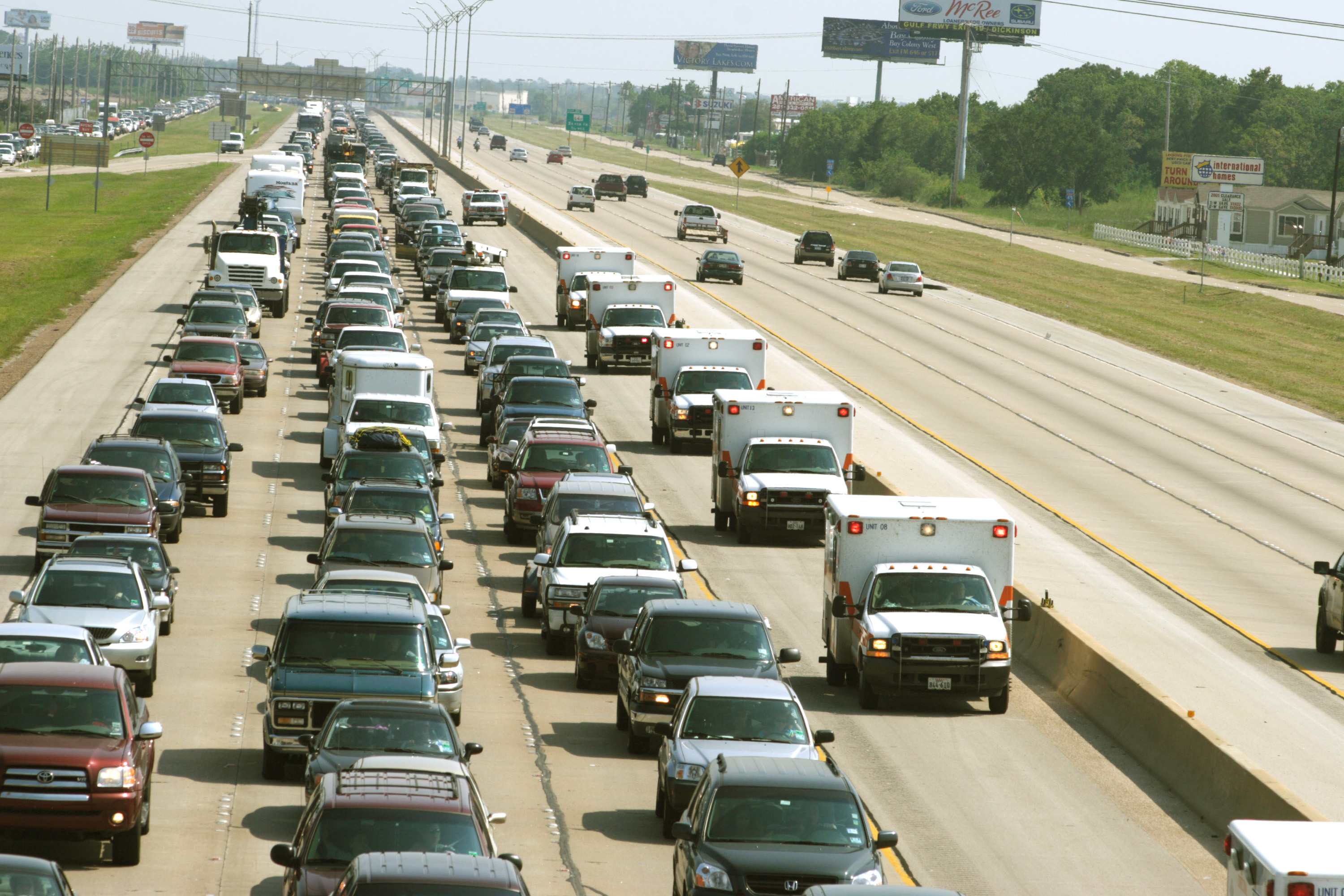
Evacuees on Interstate 45 leaving Galveston, through Houston, during Hurricane Rita in 2005. Note how no south-bound lanes (right) were used as north contra-flow lanes for vehicles turning west.

An emergency evacuation is an immediate egress or escape of people away from an area that contains an imminent threat, an ongoing threat or a hazard to lives or property.

Examples range from the small-scale evacuation of a building due to a storm or fire to the large-scale evacuation of a city because of a flood, bombardment or approaching weather system, especially a tropical cyclone. In situations involving hazardous materials or possible contamination, evacuees may be decontaminated prior to being transported out of the contaminated area. Evacuation planning is an important aspect to mitigate the impact of disasters on humans. Today there many evacuation models to simulate this process for small-scale and large-scale situations.

== Reasons ==
Special speed limit sign in the United States for evacuation routes, requiring drivers to maintain the maximum safe speed

Evacuations may be carried out before, during, or after disasters such as:

- Natural disasters
  - Eruptions of volcanoes
  - Tropical cyclones
  - Floods
  - Earthquakes
  - Tsunamis
  - Wildfires/Bushfires
- Industrial accidents
  - Chemical spill
  - Nuclear accident
- Transport
  - Road accidents
  - Train wreck
  - Emergency aircraft evacuation
- Fires
  - Industrial fires
- Military attacks
  - Bombings
  - Terrorist attacks
  - Military battles
  - Imminent nuclear war
- Structural failure
- Viral outbreak
- Robbery
- Plane crash

== Planning ==
A video explaining different types of evacuation.

Emergency evacuation plans are developed to ensure the safest and most efficient evacuation time of all expected residents of a structure, city, or region. A benchmark "evacuation time" for different hazards and conditions is established. These benchmarks can be established through using best practices, regulations, or using simulations, such as modeling the flow of people in a building, to determine the benchmark. Proper planning will use multiple exits, contra-flow lanes, and special technologies to ensure full, fast and complete evacuation. Consideration for personal situations which may affect an individual's ability to evacuate is taken into account, including alarm signals that use both aural and visual alerts, and also evacuation equipment such as sleds, pads, and chairs for non-ambulatory people.

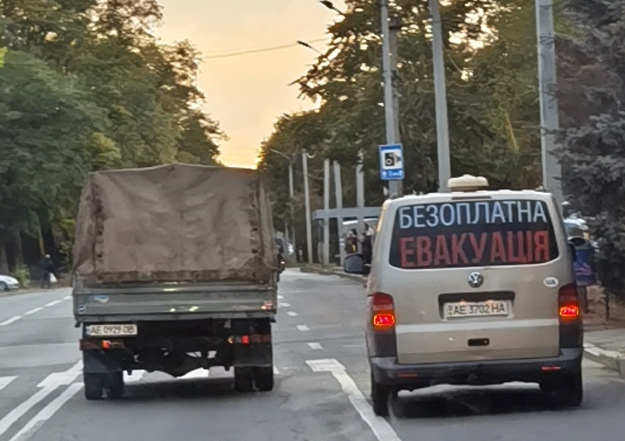
Evacuation bus in Dnipro, Ukraine during war.

Considering the persons with a disability during an emergency evacuation is important. This is because it is crucial that every user gets out of the building or to a safe place in the building, thus also the persons with disabilities or the non- ambulatory people. Regulations such as building codes can be used to minimize the negative consequences of the threat triggering the evacuation and optimize the need to self-evacuate without causing panic. Proper planning which covers designated actions to ensure the safety of the users in emergencies, will implement an all-hazards approach so that plans can be reused for multiple hazards that could exist. A Personal Emergency Evacuation Plan (PEEP) formulates a specific evacuation plan catering for the needs of an individual with mobility, sensory or other disabilities which may impact on their ability to leave a property in the event of an evacuation.

Therefore, key elements for emergency planning and preparedness are early warnings for the people inside the building by emergency helpers but also voice assistance, facilities to leave the building safe and fast, such as exit routes and good evacuation practices. The evacuation managing team must know what to do in emergency situations and which actions to take.

== Sequence ==
The sequence of an evacuation can be divided into the following phases:

1. Detection
2. Decision
3. Alarm
4. Reaction
5. Movement to an area of refuge or an assembly station
6. Transportation

The time for the first four phases is usually called pre-movement time.

The particular phases are different for different objects, e.g., for ships a distinction between assembly and embarkation (to boats or rafts) is made. These are separate from each other. The decision whether to enter the boats or rafts is thus usually made after assembly is completed.

== Small-scale ==
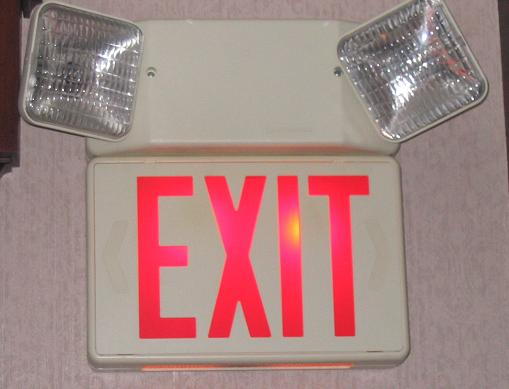
An exit sign in the United States, showing the way to the nearest exit, with two emergency lights in case an electrical failure knocks out room lighting.

ISO 7010 standard (1987) exit sign, used since 1982 in Japan.

The strategy of individuals in evacuating buildings has been investigated in many disasters in the last 50 years. The complexity of the building, the pre-movement decisions and the movement ability of the individuals represent to major factors influencing building evacuations. With increasing complexity and decreasing motion ability, the strategy changes from "fast egress", through "slow egress" and "move to safe place inside building" (such as a staircase), to "stay in place and wait for help". The third strategy is the notion of using a designated "safe haven" on the floor. This is a section of the building that is reinforced to protect against specific hazards, such as fire, smoke or structural collapse. Some hazards may have safe havens on each floor, while a hazard such as a tornado, may have a single safe haven or safe room. Typically persons with limited mobility are requested to report to a safe haven for rescue by first responders. In most buildings, the safe haven will be in the stairwell.

During an emergency evacuation, people do not immediately react after hearing the alarm signal. This is because an evacuation drill is more common. They will tend to start evacuating when there is more information given about the degree of danger. During an evacuation, people often use the most known escape route, typically the route through which they entered the building.

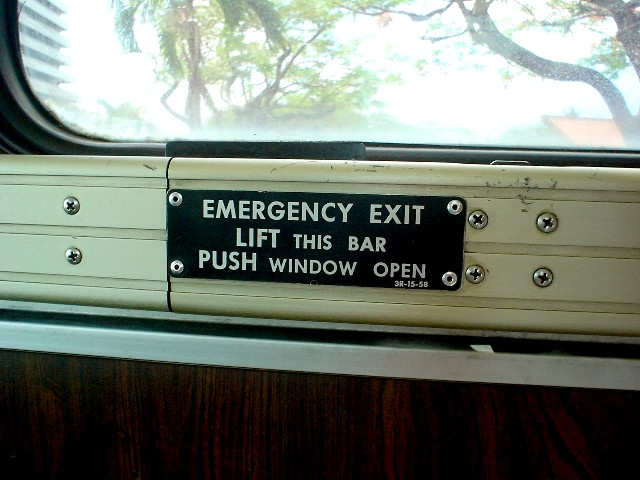
Operation guide metal plate for emergency exits installed in the school bus window.

The most common equipment in buildings to facilitate emergency evacuations are fire alarms, exit signs, and emergency lights. Some structures need special emergency exits or fire escapes to ensure the availability of alternative escape paths. Commercial passenger vehicles such as buses, boats, and aircraft also often have evacuation lighting and signage, and in some cases windows or extra doors that function as emergency exits. Commercial emergency aircraft evacuation is also facilitated by evacuation slides and pre-flight safety briefings. Military aircraft are often equipped with ejection seats or parachutes. Water vessels and commercial aircraft that fly over water are equipped with personal flotation devices and life rafts.

Since the emergence of The Internet of Things technologies, new techniques are appearing, which involves new equipment. Most of them are wireless devices such as IDs scanner, beacons or backscatter system. The new techniques are for example based on a communication protocol such as Wi-Fi, Bluetooth, UWB or RFID and the use of indoor positioning system. The use of The Internet of Things technologies in small scale evacuations can result in a faster evacuation time: Mostly by localizing the fire sources, analysing the fire spreading inside the building or finding people that are trapped inside the building. Some buildings can have a monitoring interface that provides all these kind of information to evacuate in the best way possible.

== Large-scale ==
The evacuation of districts is part of disaster management. Many of the largest evacuations have been in the face of wartime military attacks. Modern large scale evacuations are usually the result of natural disasters. The largest peacetime evacuations in the United States to date occurred during Hurricane Gustav and the category-5 Hurricane Rita (2005) in a scare one month after the flood-deaths of Hurricane Katrina.

=== Hurricanes ===
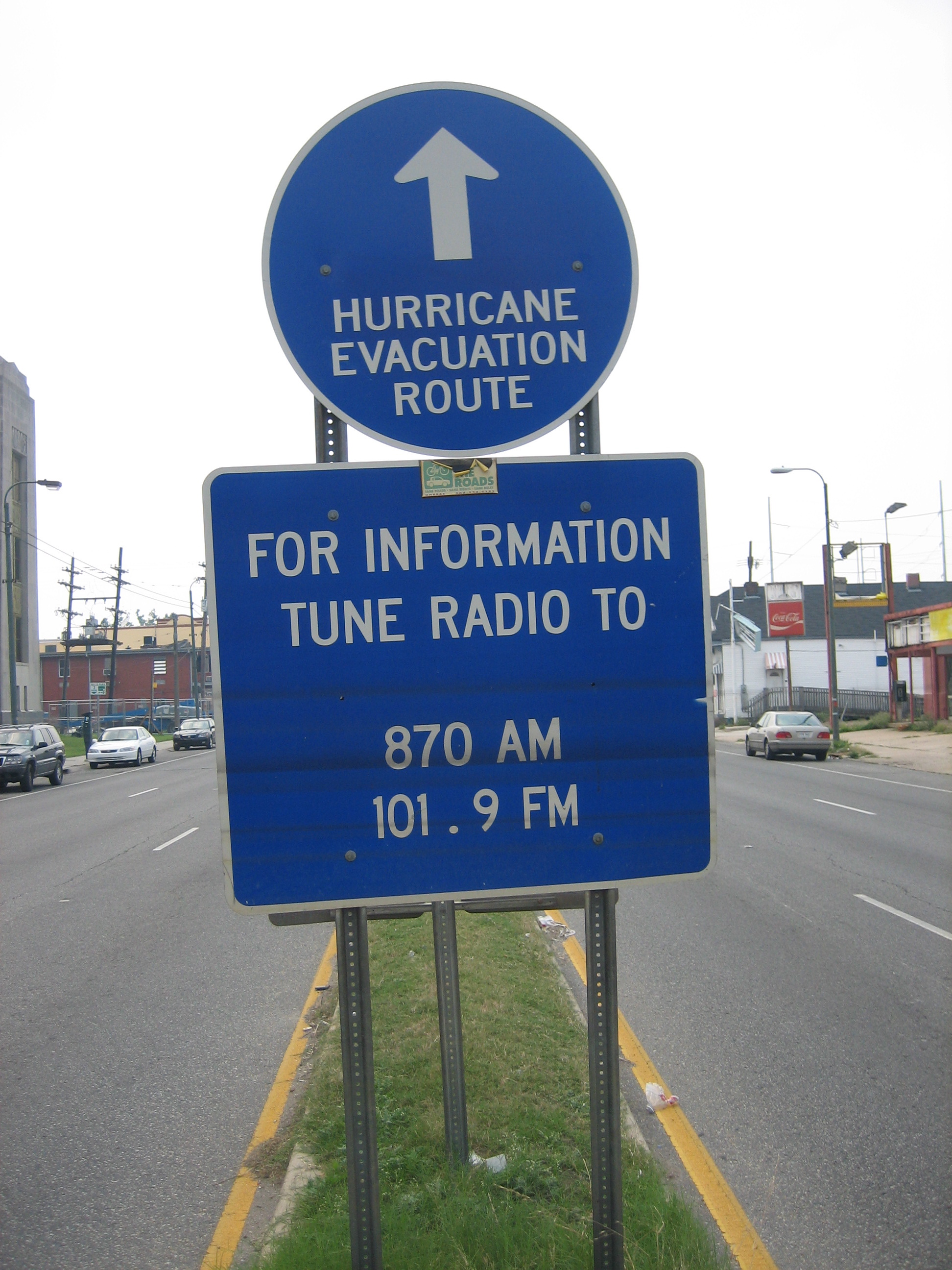
Evacuation route sign on Tulane Avenue in New Orleans after Hurricane Katrina.

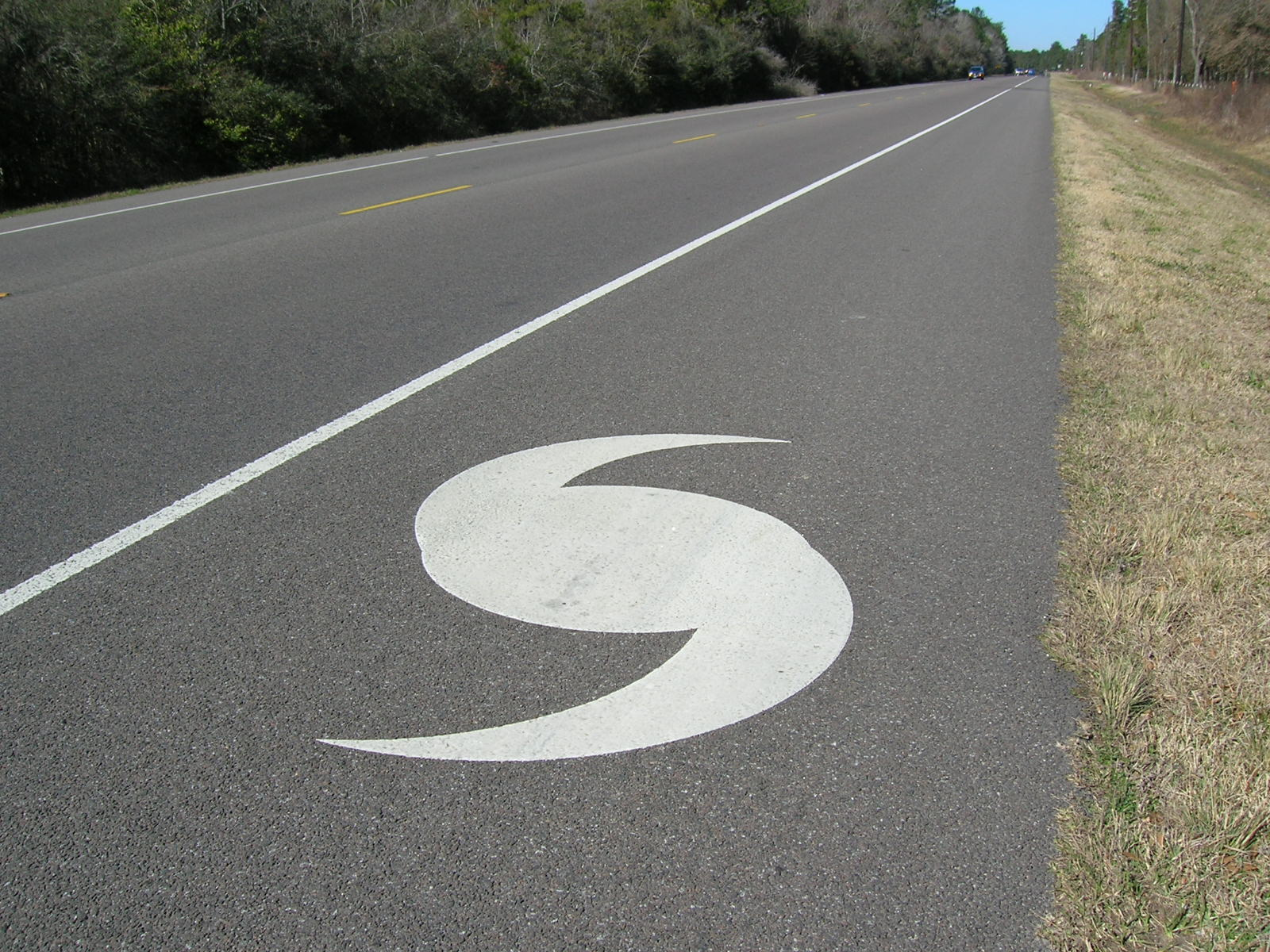
Evacuation route marking near the Texas Gulf Coast

Despite mandatory evacuation orders, many people did not leave New Orleans, United States, as Hurricane Katrina approached. Even after the city was flooded and uninhabitable, some people still refused to leave their homes.

The longer a person has lived in a coastal area, the less likely they are to evacuate. A hurricane's path is difficult to predict. Forecasters know about hurricanes days in advance, but their forecasts of where the storm will hit are only educated guesses. Hurricanes give a lot of warning time compared to most disasters humans experience. This allows forecasters and officials to "cry wolf," making people take evacuation orders less seriously. Hurricanes can be predicted to hit a coastal town many times without the town ever actually experiencing the brunt of a storm. If evacuation orders are given too early, the hurricane can change course and leave the evacuated area unscathed. People may think they have weathered hurricanes before, when in reality the hurricane didn't hit them directly, giving them false confidence. Those who have lived on the coast for ten or more years are the most resistant to evacuating.

=== Public transportation ===
Since Hurricane Katrina, there has been an increase in evacuation planning. Current best practices include the need to use multi-modal transportation networks. Hurricane Gustav used military airlift resources to facilitate evacuating people out of the affected area. More complex evacuation planning is now being considered, such as using elementary schools as rally points for evacuation. In the United States, elementary schools are usually more numerous in a community than other public structures. Their locations and inherent design to accommodate bus transportation makes it an ideal evacuation point.

== Enforcement ==
In the United States, a person usually cannot be forced to evacuate. To facilitate voluntary compliance with mandatory evacuation orders first responders and disaster management officials have used creative techniques such as asking people for the names and contact of their next-of-kin, writing their Social Security Numbers on their limbs and torso to enable identification of remains, and refusing to provide government services in the affected area, including emergency services.

== Kits ==
In preparation for emergency evacuation situations, experts often advise having an individual emergency evacuation kit prepared and on hand prior to the emergency. An emergency evacuation kit is a container of food, clothing, water, and other supplies that can be used to sustain an individual during lag time. Lag time is the period between the actual occurrence of an emergency and when organized help becomes available, generally 72 hours, though this can vary from a few hours to several days. It may take this long for authorities to get evacuation shelters fully up and functional. During this time, evacuees may suffer fairly primitive conditions; no clean water, heat, lights, toilet facilities, or shelter. An emergency evacuation kit, or 72-hour kit, can help evacuees to endure the evacuation experience with dignity and a degree of comfort.

== Cyber-physical systems ==
The development of digital infrastructure resources opened a new research area in the design of cyber-physical systems to provide the individual with safer options during an emergency evacuation.

== See also ==
- Civil defense – Protection of citizens from disasters and military attack
- Emergency management – Dealing with all humanitarian aspects of emergencies
- Evacuation simulation
- List of mass evacuations
- Emergency aircraft evacuation – Emergency evacuation of an aircraft
- Shelter in place – Act of seeking safety in the building one is in
- Symmetry breaking of escaping ants – Pattern in ant behaviour
