= Operation Fiery Vigil =

Military operation

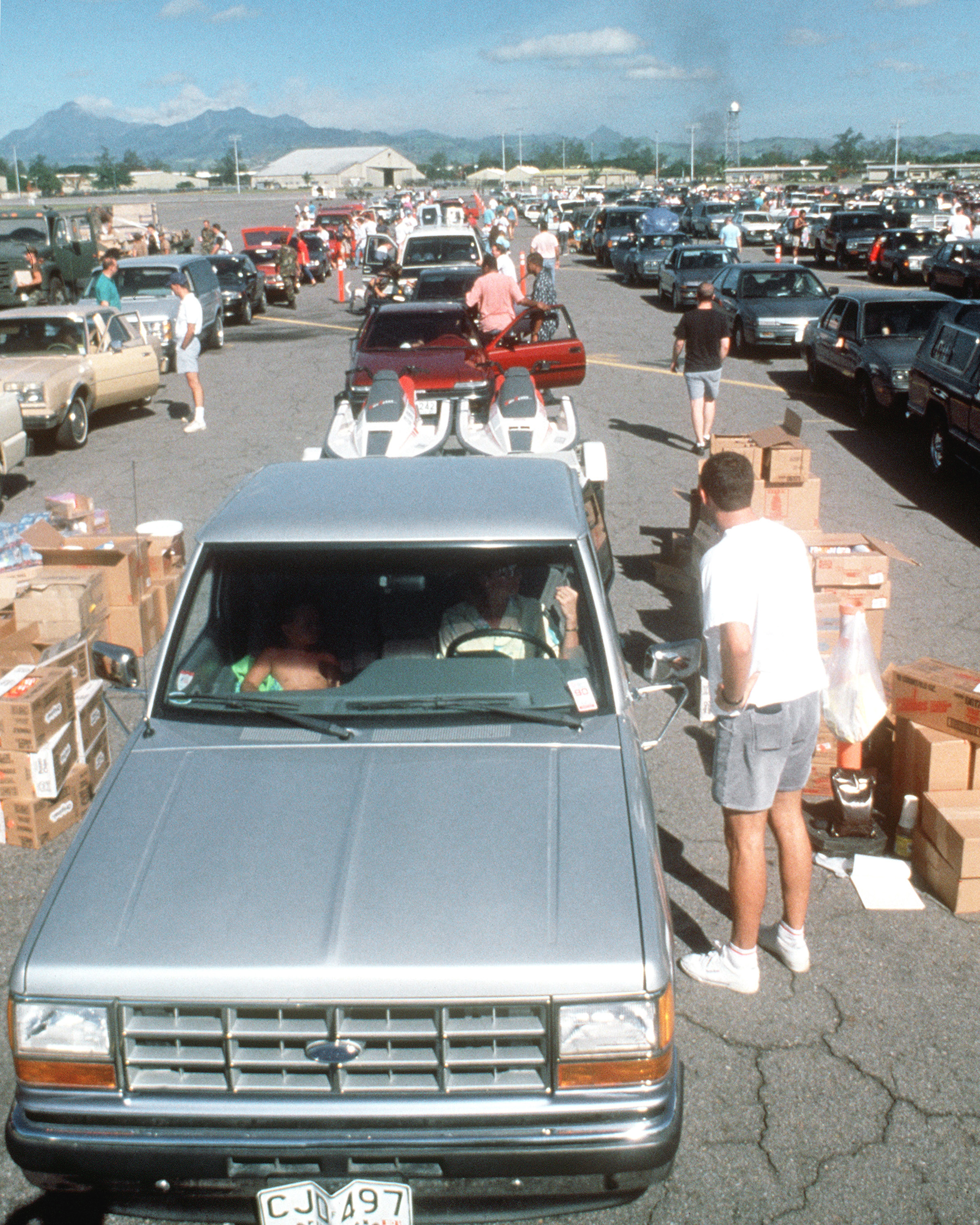
- Evacuees collecting supplies at Clark Air Base
- Location: Philippines: Clark Air Base, Luzon; Subic Bay Naval Base, Zambales
- Objective: Evacuate U.S. personnel in the aftermath of the 1991 eruption of Mount Pinatubo
- Date: June 1991

Operation Fiery Vigil was the emergency evacuation of all non-essential military and U.S. Department of Defense civilian personnel and their dependents from Clark Air Base and U.S. Naval Base Subic Bay during the June 1991 eruption of Mount Pinatubo in the Republic of the Philippines.

This Non-combatant evacuation operation transferred roughly 20,000 people from Clark Air Base and U.S. Naval Base Subic Bay back to contiguous United States by way of Cebu, Philippines. Major General William A. Studer, Commander, Thirteenth Air Force, served as Commander Joint Task Force - Fiery Vigil.

== Timeline ==
16 July 1990
A 7.8 M_{w} earthquake strikes the island of Luzon, Philippines. The epicenter was near the town of Rizal, Nueva Ecija, roughly 60 kilometers (37 mi) from Mount Pinatubo. This earthquake caused a landslide, some local tremors, and a brief increase in steam emissions from a preexisting geothermal area at Mount Pinatubo.
March–June 1991
Magma rising toward the surface from more than 32 kilometers (20 mi) beneath Mount Pinatubo triggered small earthquakes and caused powerful steam explosions that blasted three craters on the north flank of the volcano. Thousands of small earthquakes occurred beneath Pinatubo, and many thousands of tons of sulfur dioxide gas were emitted by the volcano.
7 June 1991
First magmatic eruptions, resulting in the formation of a 660-foot (200 m) high lava dome at the summit of the volcano.

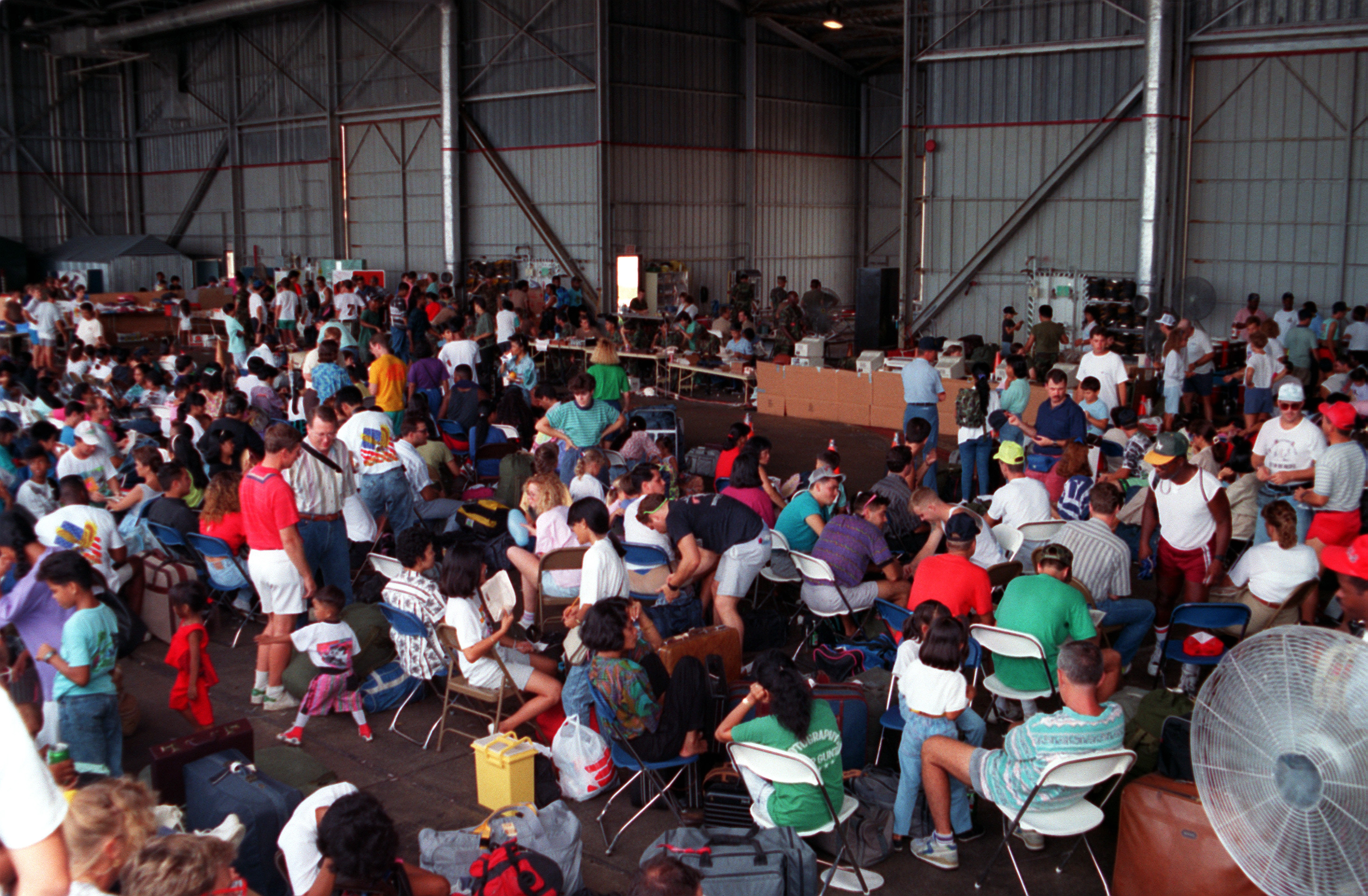
Evacuees at Andersen Air Force Base

10 June 1991
after receiving final authorization from the Secretary of Defense, all non-essential military and Department of Defense civilian personnel and their dependents initiated land evacuation from Clark Air Base at 0600 local time. This land evacuation brought an estimated 15,000 personnel and several thousand vehicles onto U.S. Naval Base Subic Bay.
12–14 June 1991
Several waves of eruptions generated eruption columns up to 80,000 feet (24,000 m) in altitude and pyroclastic flows (high speed avalanches of superheated gas and tephra) extending out to four kilometers (2.5 mi) from the summit. These eruptions were accompanied by nearly continuous seismic activity and expulsion of huge quantities of ash, tephra, and volcanic bombs.
15 June 1991
Major eruption of Mount Pinatubo, sending ash and tephra over 100,000 feet (30,000 m) into the air. Clark Air Base and Subic Bay Naval Station, the two largest U.S. military bases in the Philippines, were heavily damaged by ash from this volcanic eruption. Nearly one foot of ash sodden by rain from Typhoon Yunya (1991) accumulated on both Clark Air Base and U.S. Naval Base Subic Bay. Many buildings collapsed under the weight of the accumulated ash, and all flight operations were suspended at both bases for many days or even weeks afterwards.

== Aftermath ==
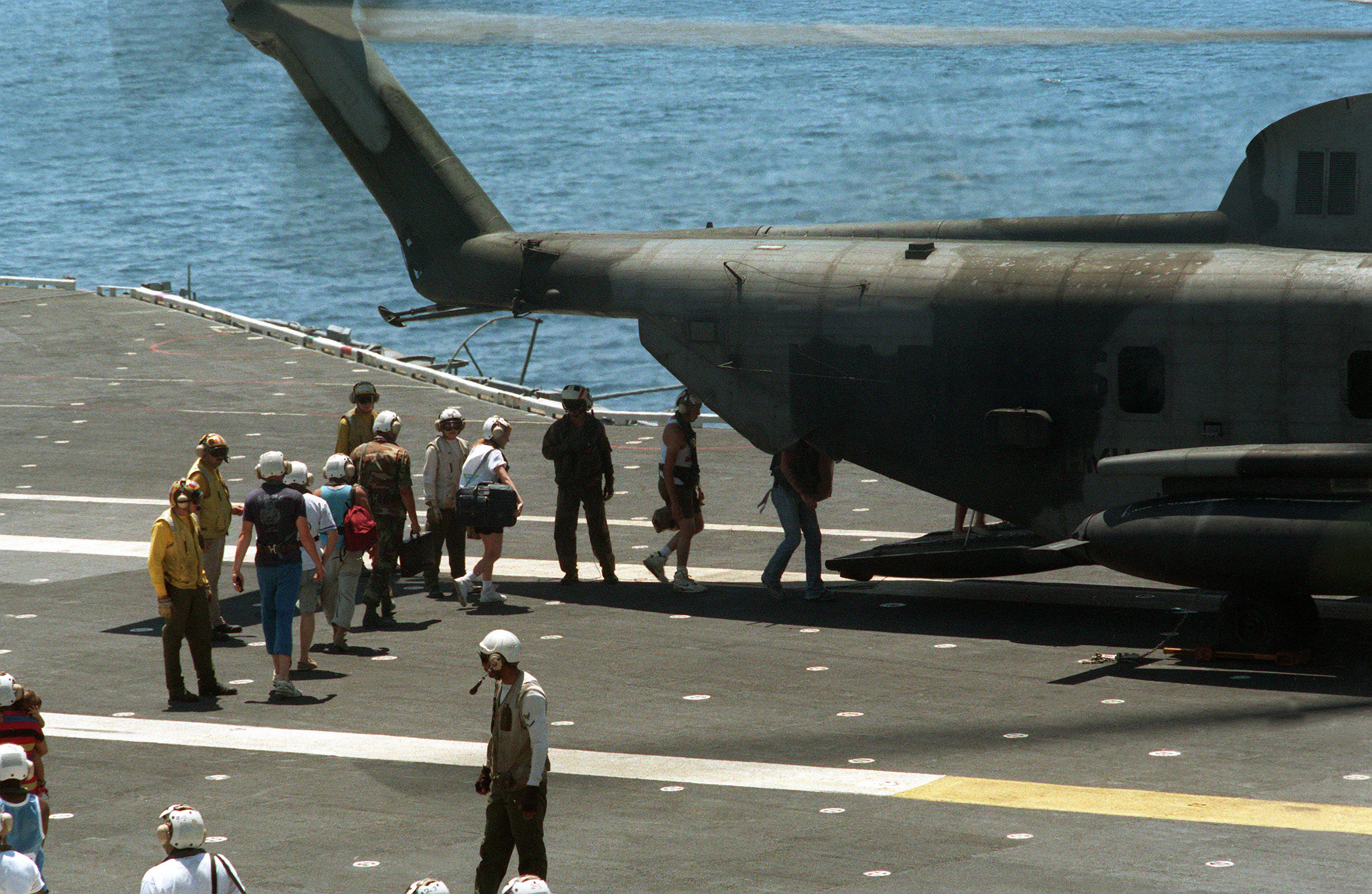
Evacuees board a CH-53 on USS Midway

The 1991 Ultra-Plinian eruption of Mount Pinatubo was the second largest terrestrial eruption of the 20th century (surpassed only by the 1912 eruption of Novarupta), and the largest eruption in living memory. The eruption produced high-speed pyroclastic flows, giant lahars, and a cloud of volcanic ash hundreds of miles across. Twenty million tons of sulfur dioxide and roughly 11 cubic kilometers (2.6 cu mi) of tephra are estimated to have been ejected in total, which corresponds to a Volcanic Explosivity Index of 6. By contrast, roughly four cubic kilometres (0.96 cu mi) of material was ejected in the 1980 eruption of Mount St. Helens; this corresponds to a VEI of 5.

Very few of the estimated 20,000 who left the base ever returned. The vast majority were evacuated to Andersen Air Force Base, Guam and processed for return to the continental United States. This figure includes approximately 5,000 who were evacuated to Cebu City on USS Midway, USS Abraham Lincoln, USS Long Beach, USS Peleliu, USS Arkansas, USS Gary, USS San Bernardino, USS Rodney M. Davis, USS Ingraham, USS Lake Champlain, USS Roanoke, and fifteen other U.S. Navy ships of the task force including the forward-deployed, Guam-based World War II-era submarine tender USS Proteus. USS Cape Cod was the first ship to enter Subic Bay and provided fresh water, manufactured coffins and volcanic ash shovels to assist SRF Subic Bay and the base with recovery and rescue operations.

22 June 1991
A team of 11 engineers and utility systems specialists from Headquarters Pacific Air Forces and the 554th Rapid Engineer Deployable Heavy Operational Repair Squadron Engineers arrives at Clark Air Base to assess the damage caused by Mount Pinatubo to determine the fate of the base.
12 July 1991
U.S. Secretary of the Air Force announces U.S. Air Force will leave the Philippines no later than 16 September 1992.
4 September 1991
A lahar, 20 to 40 feet (6.1 to 12.2 m) high and almost 200 feet (61 m) wide, smashed along the southern boundary of Clark Air Base, sweeping away a security policeman who was subsequently rescued.
5 November 1991
Secretary of the Air Force visits Clark Air Base and pays tribute to the "Ash Warriors", personnel who had remained throughout the volcanic activity and cleanup.
26 November 1991
American flag lowered for the last time by the Ash Warriors; Clark Air Base turned over to the Philippines, ending over 90 years of U.S. presence.

== See also ==
- List of largest volcanic eruptions
- List of mass evacuations
- List of natural disasters by death toll
