= Rita Fahy =

Irish American expert in evacuation modelling and human behavior in fire

- Born: 1955; United States
- Died: 2023 - 67 years
- Education: Ulster University
- Scientific career
- Fields: Evacuation, Human Behaviour in Fire
- Workplaces: National Fire Protection Association (NFPA), retired
- Thesis: Human Behaviour in Fire (2000)

Rita Fahy (October 4, 1955 – July 12, 2023) was an Irish American expert in evacuation modelling and human behaviour in fire. She carried out pioneering work in the field by developing one of the first evacuation models in history (Exit 89) and debunking the myths surrounding the panic concept in evacuation. Fahy also made substantial contributions to data collection of human behaviour in fires and ran multiple evacuation investigations, developing one of the first evacuation databases for fire protection engineers. She worked on the NFPA investigation on fatal firefighter injuries in the United States.

Given her contribution to fire safety science, the Fire Technology journal published a special Issue to commemorate her life and work.

== Education ==
Fahy earned both her bachelor's and master's degrees at Northeastern University, graduating in 1978 with a degree in mathematics and in 1989 with a degree in industrial engineering (operations research).

She earned her PhD in Human Behaviour in Fire at the University of Ulster, graduating in 2000.

== Career ==
Fahy spent her career at the National Fire Protection Association. She was involved in lecturing in the IMFSE Human Behavior in Fire course at Lund University. She was involved in the development of new fire engineering standards with the International Organization for Standardization. She was appointed editor of Fire Safety Science News for the International Association for Fire Safety Science in 2014. She developed one of the first evacuation models (EXIT89) to simulate building fire evacuations. Further, she made majior academic contribtuion in teaching and research to debunk the myths surrounding the panic concept in evacuation and for her pioneering work in developing the first databese for building evacuations.

She retired from the NFPA around 2022.

== Selected papers ==
Fahy, R. F., & Proulx, G. (2001, March). Toward creating a database on delay times to start evacuation and walking speeds for use in evacuation modeling. In 2nd international symposium on human behaviour in fire (pp. 175–183). Boston, MA, USA.

Fahy, R. F. (1991). EXIT89: an evacuation model for high-rise buildings. In Fire Safety Science (pp. 815–823). Routledge.

Fahy, R. F., & Proulx, G. (1997, March). Human behavior in the world trade center evacuation. In International Association for Fire Safety Science, Fifth International Symposium (pp. 713–724).

== Personal life ==
Fahy died on July 12, 2023, following the return of cancer.
