= Contraflow lane reversal =

Traffic control method

Contraflow lane reversal is the altering of the normal flow of traffic, typically on a controlled-access highway (such as a freeway or motorway), to either aid in an emergency evacuation (the most common usage of the term in the United States) or, as part of routine maintenance activities, to facilitate widening or reconstruction of one of the highway's carriageways (the most common usage in the United Kingdom).

Usually, the term is used to refer to reversal of lanes which are normally configured for travel in one direction; routinely changing the configuration of reversible lanes (such as during rush hour) is not normally considered contraflow lane reversal. On undivided highways, evacuation contraflow may be called evacuation reverse flow.

== Disambiguation ==
There are similar setups with slightly different usages, although the terms may be commonly used interchangeably.

- Contraflow lane: Typically used to refer to a bus lane running against a one-way street through the opposite direction.
- Contraflow lane reversal: Typically used to refer to a temporary setup of a lane running opposite to normal during special times, such as emergency evacuations, sports tournaments, or road construction/repairs.
- Reversible lane: Typically used to refer to a lane specifically designed to facilitate different directional usage regularly, with changes sometimes as frequent as twice a day.

== Emergency evacuation ==
In an emergency evacuation, contraflow lane reversal roughly doubles the number of lanes available for evacuation traffic. Crossover sections are used to move outgoing traffic to these lanes. All incoming traffic is blocked until the end of the evacuation.

Contraflow lane reversal is usually done on freeways and other controlled-access roadways; however, some examples listed below (particularly in South Carolina) are divided and undivided roadways. Use of contraflow lane reversal is generally considered to be an emergency measure, as the contraflow lanes (and any associated ramps at interchanges) lack proper signage, signals, and other traffic control devices needed to orderly conduct traffic in the opposite direction.

Generally, a significant number of police officers or other officials are needed to manually direct traffic during a lane reversal (especially at interchanges, where ramp traffic in the wrong direction must intersect with other roadways that are operating normally).

=== Hurricane evacuation ===
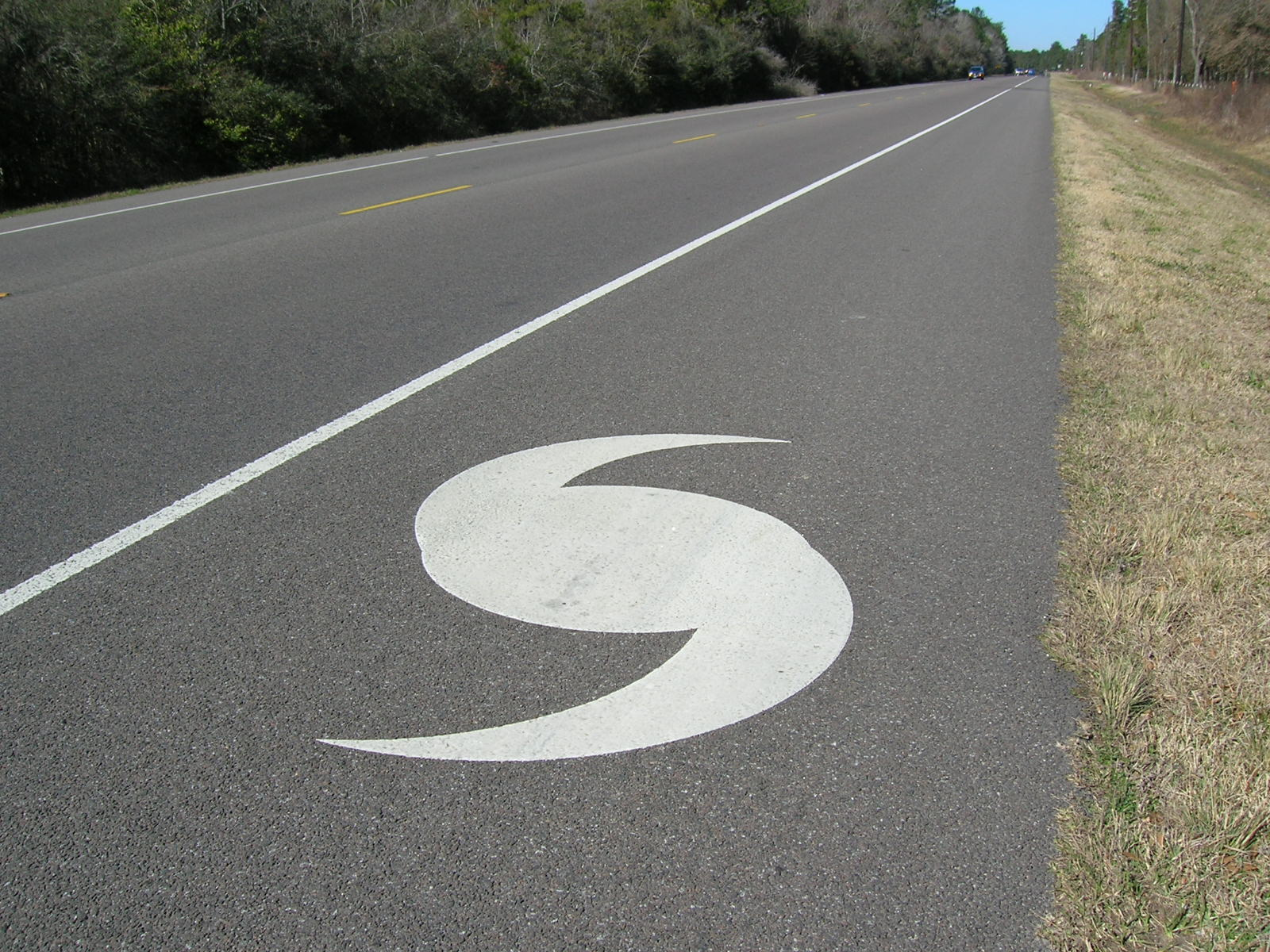
Hurricane evacuation route marking near the Texas Gulf Coast

From the 1990s, many states in the Southeastern United States adopted hurricane evacuation routes from coastal areas using contraflow lane reversals on Interstate Highways. State highway departments have coordinated on plans for traffic direction with state highway patrol agencies, constructed highway median crossovers, and installed signage for drivers and barriers and swing arms to inhibit wrong-way collisions.

Most evacuation plans involve only a single state; however, the states of Louisiana and Mississippi have developed coordinated plans to evacuate the New Orleans metropolitan area by using Interstate 55 and Interstate 59.

Current contraflow evacuation plans exist for:

- Alabama
  - Mobile via I-65

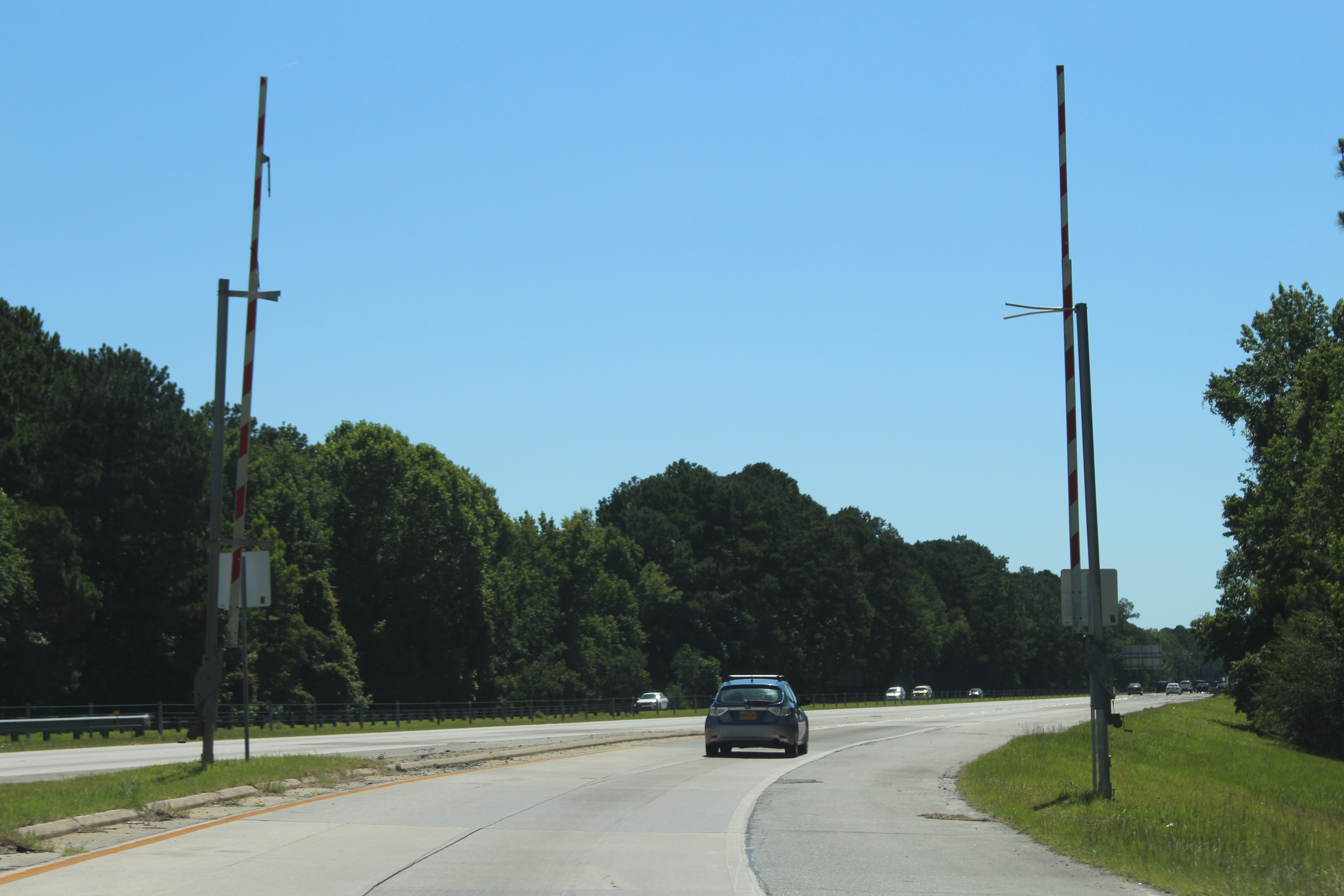
Crossing gates at the interchange between Interstate 16 and Interstate 95, used to prevent westbound access to I-16 during contraflow, Pooler, GA

- Georgia
  - Savannah, via I-16
- Louisiana
  - Lafayette, via I-49
  - Lake Charles, via I-10 and I-210
  - New Orleans metropolitan area, via I-10, I-12, I-55, I-59, and the Lake Pontchartrain Causeway
- Maryland
  - Ocean City, via US 50 and Maryland Route 90
- Massachusetts
  - Cape Cod via US-6, Route 3, and Route 28
- Mississippi
  - Mississippi Gulf Coast, via I-59 and US-49
  - New Orleans metropolitan area, via I-55
- New Jersey
  - Jersey Shore, via Route 47/Route 347, Garden State Parkway, Atlantic City Expressway, Route 72/Route 70, Route 35, and Route 138/I-195
- South Carolina
  - Beaufort, via U.S. 21
  - Charleston, via I-26
  - Georgetown County, via U.S. 17
  - The Grand Strand, via U.S. 501
  - Hilton Head Island, via U.S. 278
- Texas
  - Corpus Christi, via I-37
  - Houston, via I-10, I-45, I-69 (U.S. Highway 59), and U.S. 290
  - Freeport, Surfside Beach, and Lake Jackson via SH 288 and SH 36.
  - Rio Grande Valley, via I-2 (U.S. Highway 83) from Harlingen to McAllen, I-69E (U.S. Highway 77) from Brownsville to Harlingen, I-69C (U.S. Highway 281) from Pharr to Falfurrias
- Virginia
  - The Hampton Roads area, via I-64

Florida had contraflow evacuation plans in place until 2017. The plans were abandoned for emergency shoulder use. North Carolina has twice evaluated contraflow on I-40 from Wilmington to I-95 at Benson but rejected it.

== Highway reconstruction ==
When roads are undergoing construction amid heavy traffic, one lane of traffic may be blocked and another lane reversed.

=== Single track roads ===
Single track roads are often closed during reconstruction.

=== Two-lane arterials ===
Traffic controllers direct traffic through half of a roundabout with STOP / SLOW signs, using contraflow conditions

A construction worker or police officer directs traffic with a "Stop/Slow Paddle", which is a sign displaying "STOP" on one side and "SLOW" on the other. The sign is turned, and the other side proceeds. Traffic signals are also sometimes used, especially during bridge construction or any situation in which a lane must be closed during times when construction crews are not at work. Other cases include treating the street as a temporary one-way street in areas in which several nearby parallel streets are available as a detour for the opposing side.

=== Roads with four or more lanes ===
If road construction necessitates the complete closure of one half of a road with four or more lanes, two lanes of traffic may be shifted to the other roadway. If the road being constructed is a highway, the used half is called a semi-highway.

=== Freeways and motorways ===
When controlled-access highways undergo reconstruction, both sides are often reduced to one lane. In some cases, traffic may be shifted onto one half, making it a temporary two-lane freeway corridor. An example of this is Interstate 10 in Arizona, in which eastbound traffic is reduced to one lane and shifted onto the westbound half of the road. Another technique is to treat the rightmost hard shoulder as a travel lane. On a six-lane freeway (i.e., one containing three lanes in each direction), a third lane may be kept open for the busier direction, or the shoulder may be opened to allow for four lanes of traffic but with little or no shoulder space; emergency breakdown areas may be added. In these situations, temporary "YIELD" or "STOP" signs are usually posted on merge ramps on freeways, expressways, and uncontrolled roads with interchanges. In such cases, opposing directions are separated by jersey barriers, or in rare circumstances, traffic cones.

== Sporting events ==
At the beginning and end of major sporting events, the center turn lanes of roads around a stadium or arena may be used to accommodate event traffic. Because these lanes are typically not subject to lane control, this can be considered a limited form of contraflow reversal.

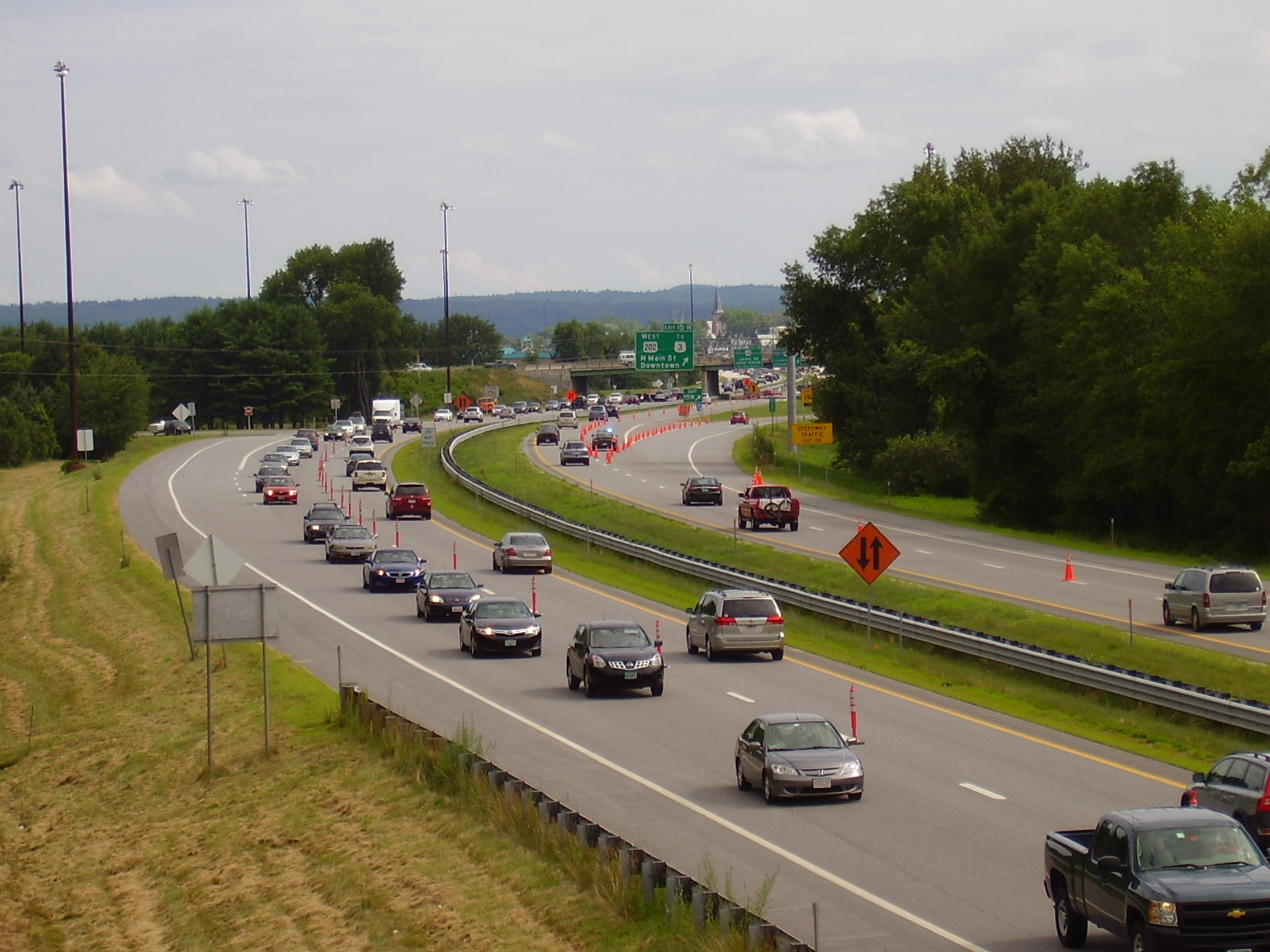
Contraflow lane reversal in operation on I-93 in Concord, New Hampshire after completion of a NASCAR race at New Hampshire Motor Speedway, looking south

Once a year, upon completion of NASCAR races at New Hampshire Motor Speedway in Loudon, New Hampshire, a form of contraflow lane reversal, referred to as "borrow a lane," is conducted on Interstate 93 in Concord, New Hampshire. In this case, the left lane of northbound Interstate 93 is temporarily "borrowed" to use as a third southbound lane. Southbound traffic has the option of transferring to the "borrowed" lane north of the Interstate 393 interchange and can travel southbound in the left northbound lane to allow a bypass of heavy race traffic entering I-93 southbound from I-393 at Exit 15. The two lanes of traffic in the normal southbound lanes, and traffic in the bypass "borrowed" lane rejoin on the southbound side of the interstate just south of the Interstate 89 interchange in Bow.

Contraflow lane reversal is also used for NASCAR Cup Series and IndyCar Series races at Pocono Raceway in Long Pond, Pennsylvania. For these races, two-lane Pennsylvania Route 115 becomes one-way southbound between Interstate 80 and the track the morning of the race until everyone has arrived at the track. After the race concludes, PA 115 becomes one-way northbound between Pocono Raceway and I-80 until everyone has left the track.

== See also ==
- Contraflow lane
- Emergency shoulder use
- Reversible lane
- Road diet
