= List of mass evacuations =

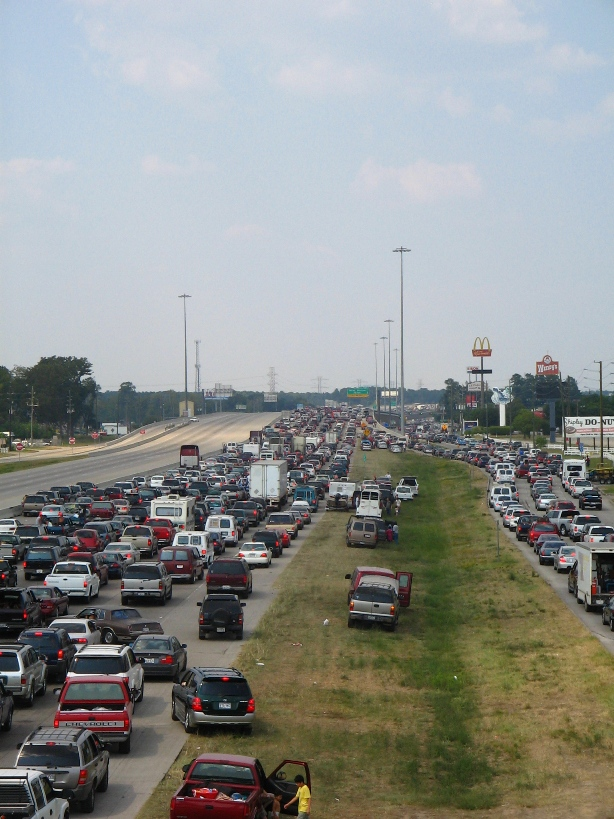
Evacuees fleeing Hurricane Rita in Texas, United States

This list of mass evacuations includes emergency evacuations of a large number of people in a short period of time. An emergency evacuation is the movement of persons from a dangerous place due to the threat or occurrence of a disastrous event whether from natural or man made causes, or as the result of war.

== Ancient times ==
- 480 BC – During The Second Persian invasion of Greece, Greek officer of the state and navy commander Themistocles ordered the evacuation of Athens as a strategic countermeasure to the approaching Persian army, leading to 100,000 inhabitants being displaced in the late summer.

== 1st century ==
- 60–61 – Boudica's uprising resulted in the mass evacuation of numerous Roman settlements in Britain.
- 79 – Eruption of Mount Vesuvius caused evacuation of Pompeii and surrounding areas.

== 5th century ==
- 410 – Sack of Rome by Visigoths under Alaric I. Many Romans were either taken captive and sold into slavery or later fled the devastated city.

== 13th century ==
- 1237–1293 – Mongol invasion of Europe: Many thousands in Eastern Europe were displaced or fled before each of several Mongol expeditions.

== 14th century ==
- 1351 – Peak of the Black Death, which led to mass evacuations in numerous cities, ports, and villages in Asia, Europe, and North Africa.

== 19th century ==
- 1836 – The Fall of the Alamo resulted in a mass evacuation of American, Mexican, Tejano, and Texian persons in what is known as the Runaway Scrape.
- 1845–1855 – The Great Famine resulted in no less than 2.1 million people fleeing Ireland. As well, roughly 1 million people died. The population of Ireland fell from 8.18 million in 1841 to 6.55 million in 1851, though the population continued to fall until 1946. The population of Ireland remains lower than recorded in 1841 in the present day.

== 20th century ==
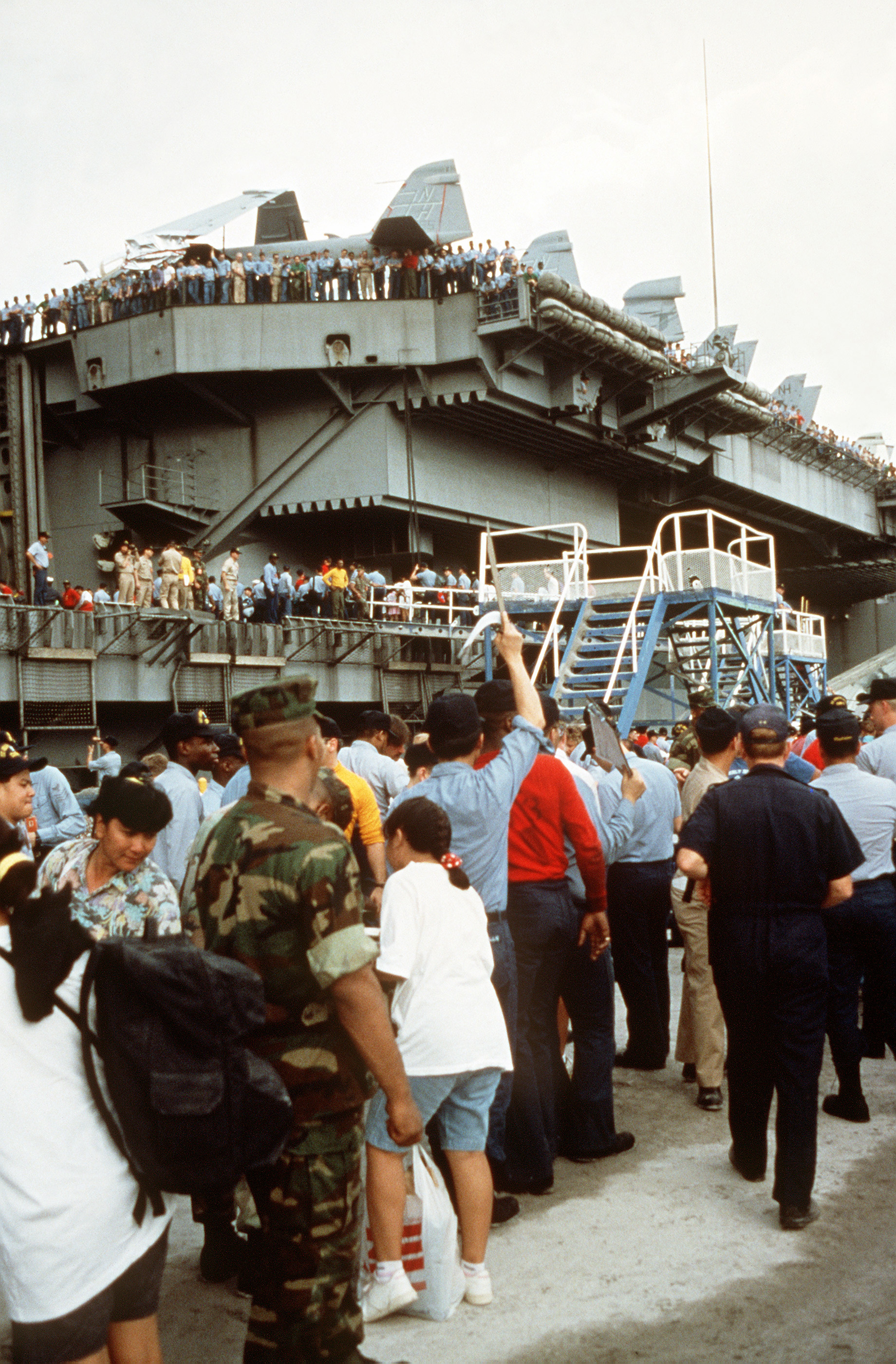
U.S. military dependents board USS Abraham Lincoln (CVN-72) in the aftermath of the 1991 eruption of Mount Pinatubo

- April 20, 1906 – The resultant fire of the 1906 San Francisco earthquake led to evacuation by sea of 20,000 refugees.
- Between March 1937 and October 1938, as the Nationalists began to gain more ground in the Spanish Civil War, nearly 3,000 children were evacuated from the Second Spanish Republic to the Soviet Union. Most of the children were from the Basque Country, Asturias, and Cantabria. On June 12, 1937, over 1,500 children and 75 tutors (teachers, doctors, and nurses) left the Port of Santurtzi in the Basque province of Bizkaia on board the ship "Habana." Similarly, nearly 4,000 children were evacuated to the United Kingdom, also on the "Habana", with HMS Hood as an escort. They became, and are still known as, "los niños de la guerra" ("the war children") or the "Gernika Generation" (as regards Basques).
- September 1939 – The evacuations of civilians in Britain during World War II; at the outset of World War II, London and other British cities were evacuated in anticipation of the Blitz, with 1.5 million displaced in the first three days of the official evacuation. The final number of evacuees reached 3.75 million.
- 1939–1940 and June 1944 – The entire population of Finnish Karelia, 522,000 people, was evacuated during the Winter War. Some 260,000 of these returned home during the Continuation War but were evacuated again in June 1944.
- May–June 1940 – Operation Dynamo was implemented during the Battle of France, with around 339,000 British and French troops evacuated from Dunkirk, France to the United Kingdom.
- 20–23 June 1940 – 24,600 people, a third of the population, were evacuated from the Channel Islands to Great Britain ahead of the German invasion.
- October 1940 – 1945 – Evacuations of children in Germany during World War II: Millions of children in Nazi Germany were evacuated into the countryside from major cities to escape air raids by the Royal Air Force and the U.S. Eighth Air Force.
- October 1941 – A mass evacuation of Moscow was ordered during the Battle of Moscow estimated 1.5 million to 3 million German Wehrmacht. Two million inhabitants were displaced within two weeks.
- 1942–1945 – Evacuation and deportation of Ingrian Finns from Ingria during and after World War II. About the entire population of Ingrian Finns (estimating 70,000 people) was evacuated from Leningrad Oblast, Russia to Estonia and Finland. Those who returned after the war faced deportations to other parts of Russia.
- Autumn 1944 – Spring 1945 – Evacuation of East Prussia (1.8 million people) and Pomerania (various estimates range between 3 and 7 million; see Flight and expulsion of Germans from Poland during and after World War II)
- June 1944 – August 1945 – Evacuations of civilians in Japan during World War II: 8.5 million Japanese civilians evacuated major cities when the U.S. Army Air Forces began routine air raids on the Japanese Home Islands during the Pacific War.
- 1945–1951 – Istrian–Dalmatian exodus: From the end of World War II through 1953, according to various data, between 250,000 and 350,000 people emigrated from Istria, Zadar, and Rijeka after these regions were ceded to Yugoslavia under the 1947 Treaty of Peace with Italy. The migrants included mostly ethnic Italians (Istrian Italians and Dalmatian Italians) but also Croats and Slovenes who opposed Josip Broz Tito's Communist regime.
- May 1950 – 100,000 people were evacuated from Winnipeg, Manitoba, Canada during the devastating Red River flood of 1950.
- Between December 10 and 24, 1950, over 100,000 UN Command troops who were cut off by the Chinese People's Volunteer Army in Northern Korea, along with an even larger number of civilian refugees, were evacuated from the North Korean port of Hungnam during the Korean War.
- July–August 1971 – 18 million people migrated from Bangladesh (then known as East Pakistan) to India to escape the military forces of Pakistan (then known as West Pakistan). This was the largest and bloodiest exodus in human history, with 4 million dead.
- 26–31 December 1974 – As a result of Cyclone Tracy destroying over 85 percent of the city, more than 60,000 people from Darwin, Australia, were evacuated from the area, leaving just 10,000 people (mainly adult males) to begin the massive cleanup.
- July 1974 – The complete, spontaneous evacuation in a few hours of Varosha before the advancing Turkish army; the population feared a massacre.
- 1975 – Operation Eagle Pull: 444 Cambodians and 146 Americans were evacuated from Phnom Penh, then in the Khmer Republic, before the city's fall to the Khmer Rouge.
- 1975 – Operation Frequent Wind: thousands of South Vietnamese and the last remaining Americans evacuate Saigon, capital of South Vietnam, before the Vietcong and North Vietnamese Army entered the city.
- July to October 1975 – After the end of the Portuguese colonial war, one million Portuguese civilians were flown from former Portuguese colonies in Africa, mainly Angola and Mozambique, back to Portugal. Thousands of flights were organized by the Portuguese government, using hundreds of commercial airplanes.
- 1975–1979 – Cambodia: After the Khmer Rouge took over the capital of Phnom Penh, all civilians were forced to evacuate the cities for the countryside, in order to create a new agrarian communist society; 2–3 million displaced.
- 1976 – Seismic activity on the island of Basse-Terre (one of Guadeloupe's six islands) led to a mass evacuation of the island's 72,000 residents. The volcano – La Grande Soufrière – erupted on August 30, but less severely than anticipated. There were no fatalities and no damage of consequence.
- November 1979 – As a result of the 1979 Mississauga train derailment, the city of Mississauga, Ontario, Canada was evacuated following a chlorine leak after a freight train derailed. 218,000 were displaced.
- April 1986 – The Chernobyl disaster involved an evacuation of an estimated 335,000 people following a nuclear meltdown at the Chernobyl nuclear power plant in Ukraine (then part of the Soviet Union).
- June 1988 – The Poole explosion caused 3,500 people to be evacuated out of the town centre in the biggest peacetime evacuation the country had seen since the World War II.
- 13 August to 11 October 1990 – During the 1990 airlift of Indians from Kuwait Air India entered the Guinness Book of World Records for the most people evacuated by a civil airliner. Over 170,000 people were evacuated from Amman to Mumbai– a distance of 4,117 km- via 488 flights operated by Indian Airlines. The operation was carried out during the Persian Gulf War to evacuate Indian expatriates from Kuwait and Iraq.
- 24–25 May 1991 – Operation Solomon; covert Israeli military operation to take 14,325 Ethiopian Jews to Israel using Israeli Air Force Lockheed C-130 Hercules transport aircraft and El Al Boeing 747 airliners.
- June 1991 – Operation Fiery Vigil was the evacuation of roughly 20,000 non-essential military and United States Department of Defense civilian personnel and their dependents from Clark Air Base and U.S. Naval Base Subic Bay back to the [contiguous United States]] during the eruption of Mount Pinatubo in the Philippines.
- February 1995 – At least 200,000 people were evacuated in the Netherlands due to flooding.
- April 5, 1995 – Nearly 10,000 inhabitants of Pergamino, Buenos Aires, Argentina were evacuated for several days because of flooding.
- August 1995 - The complete, spontaneous evacuation of almost 200 000 Serbs in a few hours of unrecognized self-proclaimed proto-state Republic of Serbian Krajina (today Croatia) before the advancing Croatian army during Operation Storm; the population feared a massacre.
- April 1997 – Nearly 50,000 residents of Grand Forks, North Dakota were evacuated due to flooding from the Red River of the North, which overtopped levees.
- July–August 1998 – Nearly 14 million people were evacuated because of massive flooding and landslides in north and central China, and 5.6 million houses were destroyed. An additional 300,000 people were evacuated on August 7 in anticipation of a possible breach of dikes along the Yangtze River.
- 1999 – The Kosovo War led to 800,000 refugees, not all of them urban residents, leaving Kosovo and being accommodated for up to three months in other parts of Europe.
- September 1999 – The size of Hurricane Floyd, its intensity, and its track prompted public officials to launch the largest evacuation in U.S. history, with an estimated 3 million people fleeing the storm.

== 21st century ==
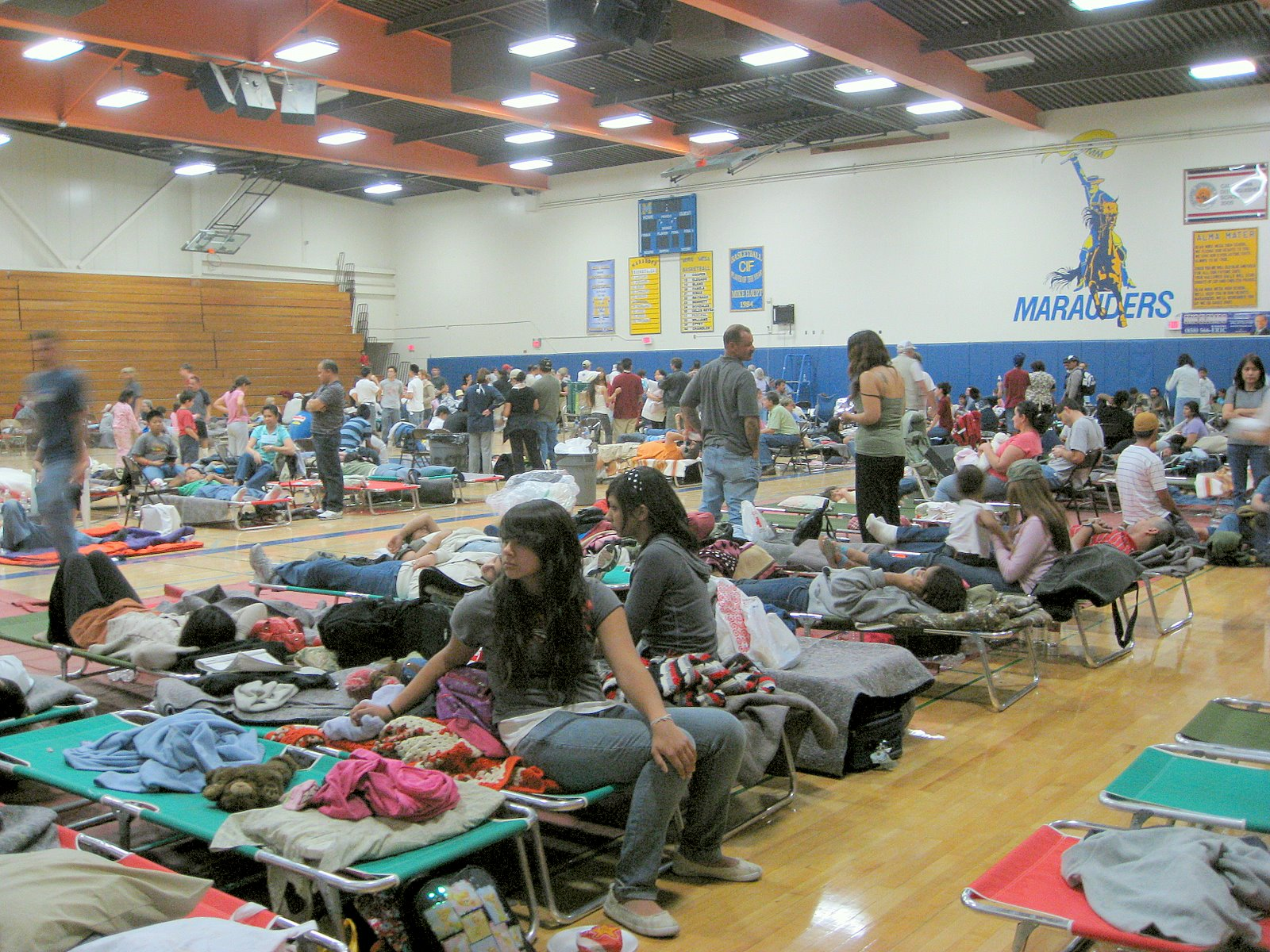
Evacuees at evacuation site Mira Mesa High School

- April 29, 2001 – 77,000 inhabitants (around 2/3 of the population of Vicenza, Italy) were evacuated for several hours so that an unexploded bomb, originally dropped in World War II, could be safely disarmed.
- September 11, 2001 – Evacuations from high-rise buildings across the United States. This included 3200+ survivors of the World Trade Center disaster and inhabitants of downtown Manhattan, New York City. Numerous other evacuations of high-rises in Chicago, Illinois included the Sears Tower and the James R. Thompson Center. The evacuation of New York included the largest sea evacuation in recorded history, with over 500,000 being evacuated in 9 hours by hundreds of boats.
- January 2002 – 300,000 residents of the city of Goma, Democratic Republic of the Congo were evacuated in three days due to the eruption of the Mount Nyiragongo.
- August 2002 – The 2002 European floods led to the evacuation of 50,000 residents of Prague, Czech Republic, on 13 August, with a total of 200,000 Czechs during the second week of August. Elsewhere in Europe, more than 120,000 people were evacuated in the German city of Dresden, 36,000 in the German state of Saxony-Anhalt, and 1,500 in Hungary.
- September 2004 – Evacuation orders were issued for over 2.8 million residents in advance of Hurricane Frances, potentially the largest in Florida's history. FEMA later granted assistance to 229,500 applicants largely associated with relocation expenses.
- July 2005 – 20,000 people were evacuated from the city of Birmingham in the United Kingdom after a security alert due to a bomb scare.
- August 2005 – Hurricane Katrina led to a mass evacuation of the city of New Orleans, Louisiana, with approximately 80% of the city's population of 484,000 evacuating before the storm struck.
- September 22, 2005 – At least 2.5 million evacuated coastal Texas and Louisiana due to the approach of Hurricane Rita. This was the second largest evacuation in U.S. history, and the third largest peacetime evacuation in modern times.
- July to August 2006 – The evacuation of nearly 15,000 American citizens from Lebanon during July and August 2006 during the 2006 Lebanon War was one of the largest overseas evacuations of American citizens in recent history.
- October 2007 – More than 1.4 million people were evacuated in the Chinese provinces of Zhejiang and Fujian in anticipation of Typhoon Krosa.
- October 2007 – California wildfires forced more than 900,000 people in Southern California to evacuate, making it the largest evacuation in California's history and the largest evacuation for fire in United States history.
- May 2008 – 2008 Sichuan earthquake: Approximately 200,000 people were evacuated in Beichuan County, China because of flooding fears after a landslide-created dam became unstable.
- August 2008 – At least 1.9 million people were evacuated from coastal Louisiana, including New Orleans, for Hurricane Gustav. In western Cuba, at least 300,000 people were evacuated.
- April 2009 – At least 30,000 Tamil people were rescued in Puthumathalan and Amplalavanpokkani during the final stages of the Sri Lankan war. The civilians were rescued by the Sri Lankan military as they were being used as human shields by the LTTE terrorist group. The evacuation was possible after troops captured a 3 km-long earth bund where the LTTE was forcibly holding civilians to protect its leadership.
- March 2011 – Following the Fukushima Daiichi nuclear disaster, between 170,000 and 200,000 people were evacuated within a 50-mile radius of the Fukushima I Nuclear Power Plant in fear of large casualties due to radiation poisoning.
- August 2011 – A mass evacuation stretching from North Carolina to New York was ordered because of Hurricane Irene and its size.
- June 2013 – 2013 North India floods: Nearly 1,000,000 people evacuated in 12 days from Uttarakhand, India due to a flash flood and landslide. This operation was completed by the Indian Air Force, ITBP, NDRF, and local authorities. Helicopters were widely used because road networks were severely damaged.
- June 2013 – 2013 Alberta floods: Over 100,000 people were evacuated from communities across southern Alberta due to catastrophic flooding around June 19–20, 2013. At least 80,000 of these were residents of Canada's 4th largest city, Calgary, while nearly the entire 13,000-person population of the town of High River was evacuated.
- October 2013 – Nearly 1,000,000 people were evacuated in 36 hours from the coastal areas of Odisha and Andhra Pradesh in the face of Cyclone Phailin. This operation was completed by the Indian Air Force, ITBP, ODRF, and local authorities.
- December 2014 – Nearly 1,000,000 people were evacuated in the eastern Philippines before Typhoon Hagupit.
- April 2015 – Operation Maitri was carried out by India to evacuate stranded Indian citizens and foreigners from Nepal and humanitarian relief during the Nepal earthquake of magnitude 8.8.
- April 2015 – Operation Raahat was carried out by India to evacuate stranded Indian citizens from Yemen. A total of 4640 Indian citizens and 960 foreign nationals were rescued.
- May 2016 – Approximately 88,000 people were evacuated from Fort McMurray, Canada, due to a wildfire that grew out of control quickly. This was the largest evacuation in the Province of Alberta's history. Evacuees went north to Oil Sands camps, and communities to the south.
- October 2016 – More than 2.5 million people were told to evacuate in Florida, Georgia and South Carolina due to the approach of Hurricane Matthew, which became the tenth most destructive in U.S. history.
- February 2017 – Evacuation of 188,000 civilians from the city of Oroville, California and other towns near the Oroville Dam due to impending failure of auxiliary spillway systems.
- July to September 2017 – Evacuation of Cariboo Regional District, British Columbia, Canada, resulted in 35,616 people under evacuation order or alert over 77 days due to a record-setting wildfire season, with 996,141 hectares burnt in 232 fires, and 60 homes and 167 other structures destroyed over 48,099 km^{2}. No deaths were recorded.
- September 2017 – One week after Hurricane Harvey rampaged coastal Texas and Louisiana, 7 million people (in Florida, Georgia, and South Carolina) were told to evacuate due to Hurricane Irma. Low estimates of the actual number of evacuees is 700,000 people.
- October 26–27, 2019 – Threat of the Kincade Fire forced at least 185,000 people from their homes in Sonoma County, California, making it the largest evacuation in that county's history. The peak winds on October 27 were expected to be hurricane-force, the strongest in several years, making fire spread very easily. Also, memories of the devastating October 2017 fires and the 2018 Camp Fire were etched in people's minds.
- August 2021 – Kabul Air lift was the result of American and NATO-ISAF forces withdrawal from Afghanistan after the February 2020 Doha Agreement, the 2021 Taliban offensive against the Afghan Government, and the collapse of the Afghan National Government and Armed forces. The sudden takeover of major cities including the Capitol of Kabul led to a rush of foreign governments, citizens, and panicked Afghan citizens to Hamid Karzai International Airport. The United States Central Command in conjunction with NATO Allies and private air carriers evacuated more than 120,000 people over the course of two weeks including the remnant of the Afghan Air Force and Special Forces stationed at Kabul. The evacuation was increasingly dangerous as threats of terror attacks from ISIS-K and radical groups increased. Resulting in a suicide bomb attack killing 13 US service members killed and 200 civilians.
- September 2021 – The 2021 Cumbre Vieja volcanic eruption caused the evacuation of around 7,000 people, and the lava flow covered over 670 hectares.
- December 2021 – An estimated 37,500 people were evacuated in 3-4 hours due to the Marshall Fire in Boulder County. The fire destroyed over 1,000 homes and killed 2 people.
- 2022 – Ukrainian refugee crisis: The Ukrainian refugee crisis is a mass evacuation due to the 2022 invasion of Ukraine. Many refugees from Ukraine fled their homes to escape conflict. Many refugees travelled to Poland, Bulgaria, Romania, and other European countries. The UK also supplied visas for refugees. People donated clothes and humanitarian aid to those in need.
- 2023 – Approximately 25,900 residents of the Northwest Territories, Canada, had to evacuate throughout the 2023 summer wildfire season due to multiple wildfires threatening nine separate communities. The capital city of the territory, Yellowknife, with a population of 20,340, declared an evacuation order and requested for those with vehicles to leave by road during a 36 hours period in which the fire behavior was expected to be minimal, given a fire was approaching alongside the only road out of the community. Those who could not leave by vehicle were evacuated by airplane to Alberta, Canada. The 2023 wildfire season in Canada saw the most area burned in Canada's recorded history.
- 2023 – Flight of Nagorno-Karabakh Armenians
- 2023 – Evacuation of the northern Gaza Strip
- September–October 2024 – A series of evacuation orders were issued in Florida in preparation for hurricanes Helene and Milton.
- October 23–24, 2024 – During Cyclone Dana over 1.1 million residents of both Bangladesh and India evacuated due to the severity and intensification Dana went under.
- 2025 – More than one million people evacuated from coastal and low-lying areas across Luzon and Bicol, Philippines, ahead of Typhoon Fung-wong.
