= Evacuation model =

Model simulating an emergency evacuation

Evacuation models are simulation tools designed to predict the movement and behaviour of individuals during an emergency evacuation. These models are today used to simulate evacuations for several disasters, such as building fires, wildfires, hurricanes, and tsunamis. These models have been under development since the late 1970s, and they are now widely to assess the time required to evacuate buildings, cities or wider regions.

A small-scale simulation of a classroom run on FDS+Evac

Evacuation simulation of a bottleneck using FES+Evac

== History ==
The earliest computer-based evacuation models, such as EVACNET (developed in the late 1970s), FPETool (introduced in 1990), and EXIT89 (from the 1980s), were developed in response to the growing need for accurate assessment of evacuation times. These models emerged to address limitations in manual evacuation calculations, particularly as building designs and fire safety regulations became more complex. EVACNET focused on using network optimisation to reduce congestion during evacuations. FPETool, developed by NIST, provided detailed predictions of fire behaviour, smoke spread, and egress times to aid fire safety engineers. EXIT89, developed by Dr Rita Fahy, added a behavioural dimension, simulating how individuals might respond to evacuation orders. These models paved the way for more advanced simulations by automating critical safety assessments and optimising building evacuation strategies

== Simulation scale ==
Small-scale models, typically used for building evacuations, focus on individual or group dynamics within confined environments, such as offices, residential buildings, or public spaces, taking into account factors like building layout, fire spread, and occupant behaviour. These models often incorporate agent-based or microscopic approaches to simulate detailed interactions and decision-making processes. One of the last surveys shows that there are 72 small-scale evacuation models currently in use for fire evacuation.

In contrast, large-scale evacuation models deal with mass evacuations from broader areas, such as urban environments or regions affected by natural disasters like wildfires or earthquakes. These models emphasise traffic flow, route optimisation and infrastructure capacity – addressing the logistical challenges of moving large populations over significant distances.

== Simulation resolution ==
The simulation resolution in evacuation models refers to the level of detail and granularity used to represent evacuees and their environment during a simulation.

At the microscopic scale, each individual is modelled as an independent agent with unique characteristics such as speed, decision-making abilities, and interactions with others, making this approach ideal for detailed simulations of small spaces like buildings.

Macroscopic models, on the other hand, treat people as a collective flow, using principles similar to fluid dynamics to represent large crowds or populations in more general terms, often applied to large-scale evacuations such as citywide scenarios.

Mesoscopic models bridge the gap between these two. This approach represents groups of individuals as a collective unit while maintaining some individual behaviours, making them useful for medium-sized environments or scenarios where detailed interaction is less important than overall flow.

The choice of simulation scale is crucial in balancing model complexity, computational cost and the specific goals of the evacuation study.

== Movement representation ==
Movement representation refers to how the physical movement of evacuees is simulated within a space, influencing the accuracy and realism of the model.

Grid-based models divide the environment into discrete cells, with individuals moving from one cell to another based on simple rules, often used in cellular automata approaches. These models are effective for simulating movement in structured environments like corridors but can be limited in capturing fluid, natural movement.

Continuous models provide a more flexible representation, allowing evacuees to move freely in any direction within a continuous space. These models are often used with agent-based or force-based simulations, where individuals adjust their speed and direction based on personal preferences, obstacles, and interactions with others.

Network-based models abstract the environment into nodes and links, where movement is simplified to navigating from one point to another along predefined paths, commonly used in large-scale scenarios like transportation networks.

Each method of movement representation has strengths and is chosen based on the environment's complexity, required accuracy and computational efficiency.

== Use ==
Small-scale evacuation models are used to simulate and analyze how people evacuate buildings or outdoor environments in emergency situations. These models are essential tools for fire safety engineering, urban planning, and emergency preparedness. They help in assessing the effectiveness of building designs, evacuation routes, and safety procedures by representing how individuals or crowds move and behave during evacuations. They are commonly used in complex, high-occupancy environments like train or metro stations, shopping malls, arenas or stadiums, high-rise buildings, and residential or office buildings. These models play a crucial role in ensuring the safety and efficiency of evacuation procedures. Their primary application is to ensure compliance with building codes and safety standards, particularly in structures where prescriptive fire regulations may not be easily met.

Large-scale evacuation models are primarily used by emergency management agencies, urban planners, transportation authorities, and event security teams to plan, simulate, and optimize evacuation strategies during disasters, industrial accidents, or large public events. These models are used to predict traffic flow, identify bottlenecks, and evaluate different evacuation routes or traffic management strategies. Event planners and security personnel also rely on evacuation models to ensure the safety of large crowds during mass gatherings, enabling them to plan efficient exits in case of emergencies. These models are also utilized by governments and civil protection agencies to develop evacuation plans for cities, ensuring that evacuation routes are effective under various emergency scenarios.
