= Pre-movement time =

Pre-movement time is the time going from the start of and emergency requiring an evacuation and the time an household or a pedestrian start moving towards a safe place. The term is generally used in referring to both large-scale and small evacuations. Events that can require pre-movement time include building fires,hurricanes, wars, nuclear accidents, and major conflagrations.

Pre-movement time is divided into four distinct events: detection, the recognition of the emergency; decision, to commence evacuation or not, and of how many people and how great a territory; alarm, the announcement of the decision and conveyance to the populace, often by emergency broadcasts or over police loudspeakers, or by actual alarms, such as sirens; and reaction, the events and actions of the people affected, both emergency personnel and the citizenry, immediately after the declaration.

Panic is rarely observed during this time, despite media depictions to the contrary. At first, lack of response arising from ignorance of the situation to outright disbelief or denial, is often noted. Different, confusing stimuli (e.g., smells of burning or smoldering, smoke, power outages, or tremors) may be detected and not put together to form a plan to evacuate, thus increasing pre-movement time. If occupants are performing some task or engaging in an activity, they may complete their business before tending to the crisis, even if they had some prior knowledge of it.

As stimuli increase, those affected likely will attempt to ascertain the cause(s); some may walk around their immediate area, look in rooms or offices, and open doors. They may call the custodian or building superintendent to find out the problem. If no response is forthcoming, those affected likely will begin to talk among themselves and figure out the best plan of action. Depending on the information and cues available, this pre-movement time can last from a few seconds to several minutes.

Part of pre-movement time also involves actions related to saving a structure (especially one's own home or domicile) or personal valuables. Some people will warn others of a danger, especially those close to them like family or dear friends. Evacuees will often contact family members by phone or e-mail to let them know that they are safe and are starting their evacuation. These types of actions are all part of pre-movement time.

Reaction time to an evacuation can vary widely, depending on the type of emergency, its perceived danger, and any false alarms of such an emergency beforehand. It can even be affected by the means of communication. In one study, mock alarms were broadcast to subway riders in London, England using different forms of address: a simple bell, a bell followed by instructions from subway staff, a public address announcement lasting 30 seconds and broadcast twice, a combination of staff instructions and public address, and finally by instructions, public address, informing people of the emergency, and announcing the type of emergency. In most cases, but not always, the more forceful the call to evacuate and the more staff were involved, the quicker riders got on escalators to evacuate.
