= Contraflow lane =

Type of traffic lane

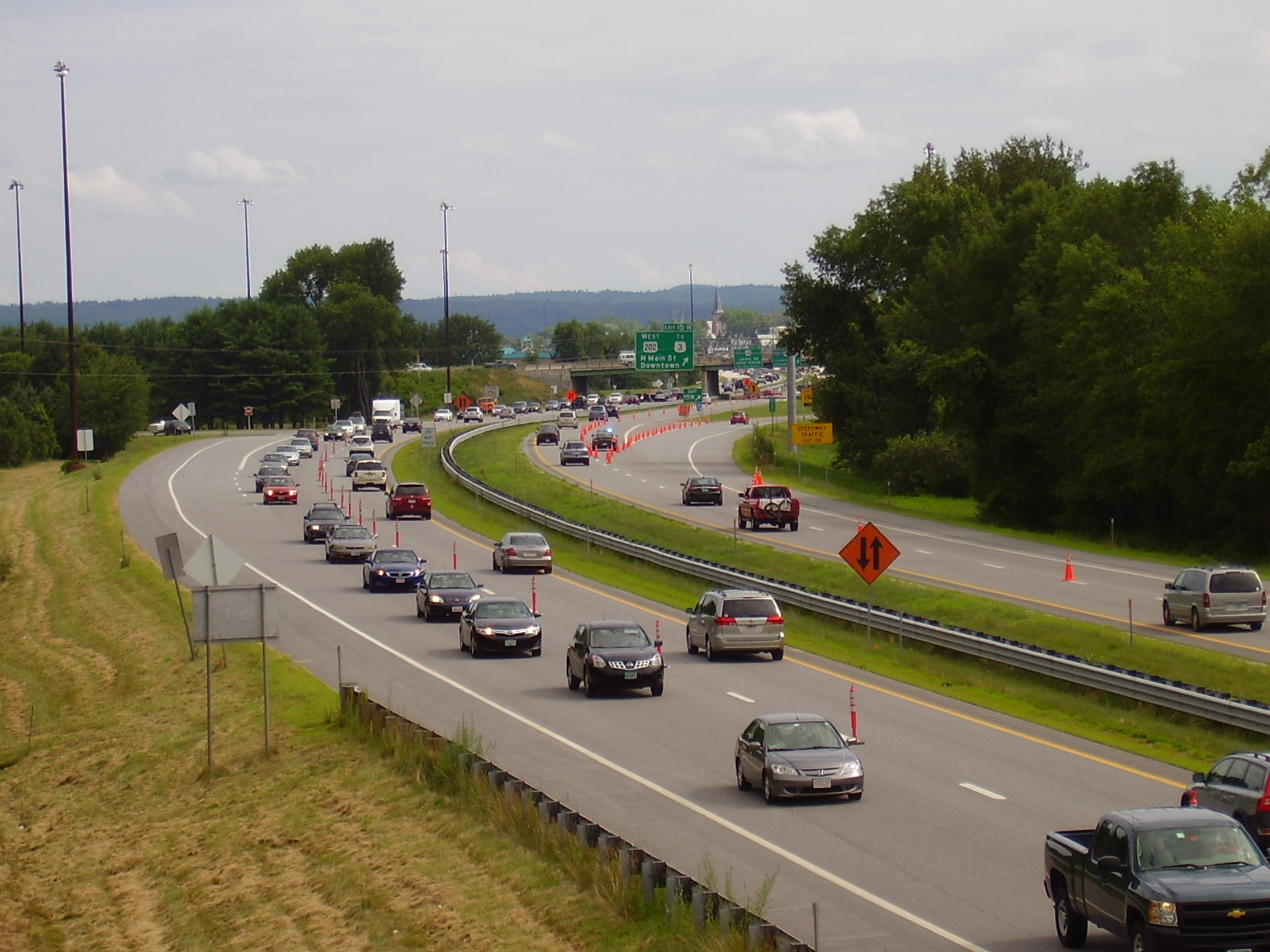
Temporary contraflow lane in Concord, New Hampshire

In transport engineering nomenclature, a counterflow lane or contraflow lane is a lane in which traffic flows in the opposite direction of the surrounding lanes.

Contraflow lanes are often used for bicycles or bus rapid transit on what are otherwise one-way streets. In a sample configuration for buses, a street might have four lanes: the outermost lanes are reserved for buses in both directions, while the center two lanes are available for general traffic in only one direction. Thus, the street functions as two-way for buses, but one-way for all other vehicles.

In certain situations, reversible lanes will be contraflow for a portion of the day. The Lincoln Tunnel XBL to the Lincoln Tunnel is a contraflow exclusive bus lane for buses during the morning peak period. The XBL lane is fed by the New Jersey Turnpike at Exits 16E and 17, and New Jersey Route 3. The helix, tunnel, and terminal are owned and operated by the Port Authority of New York and New Jersey, the bi-state agency that also operates the 2.5-mile (4.02 km) contraflow lane along the left lane of three westbound lanes. The XBL serves over 1,800 buses, which transport more than 65,000 persons, each morning and is a major component of the morning "inbound" commutation crossing the Hudson River.

When lanes on motorways are closed for repair and maintenance, a contraflow lane may be set up on the other side of the central reservation.

== Disambiguation ==
There are similar setups with slightly different usages, although the terms may be commonly used interchangeably.

- Contraflow Lane: Typically used to refer to a bus lane running against a one-way street through the opposite direction
- Contraflow Lane Reversal: Typically used to refer to a temporary setup of a lane running opposite to normal during special times, such as emergency evacuations, sports tournaments, or road construction/repairs.
- Reversible Lane: Typically used to refer to a lane specifically designed to facilitate different directional usage regularly, with changes sometimes as frequent as twice a day.

== Mass transit ==
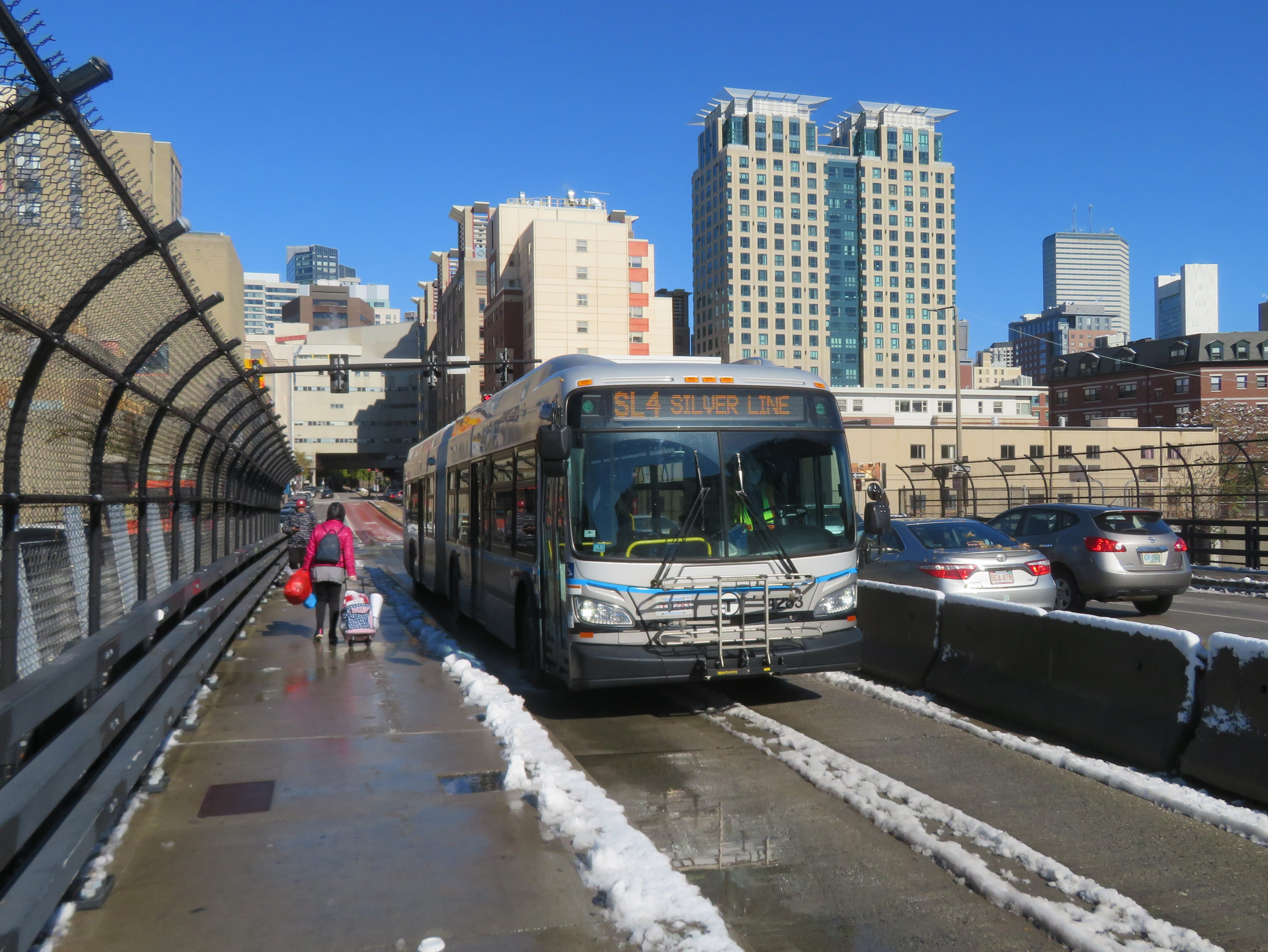
An MBTA Silver Line bus using a contraflow lane in Boston

Contraflow bus lanes, areas in which a dedicated lane of an otherwise one way street is reversed for buses and other mass transit, exist in locations such as:

- Downtown Los Angeles, CA
- Pittsburgh, PA
- Belfast, United Kingdom
- Through the Lincoln Tunnel between New Jersey and New York City
- Downtown Minneapolis, MN
- Leeds, United Kingdom
- London, United Kingdom
- Paris, France
- Lyon, France
- Edmonton, AB
- Calgary, AB
- Montreal, QC (Champlain Bridge)
- San Juan, PR
- Mexico City, Mexico
- São Paulo, Brazil
- Houston, TX
- Downtown Austin, TX
- Hong Kong Island, SAR Hong Kong (similar lanes are also reserved for trams)
- Liège, Belgium
- Downtown Denver, CO (Light rail on California and Stout streets)
- Celebration Pointe Ave at Gainesville, Florida

From June 1990 to June 2002, a similar line existed in Montreal, along Pie-IX Boulevard; this was indefinitely suspended after two fatalities. Government buses use a bus-only contraflow lane on Macquarie St in Hobart, Tasmania, Australia.

Authorised buses, emergency vehicles and taxis use a contraflow lane on Petrie Tce, Brisbane, Queensland, Australia.

Tram lanes are an extension to this system found in cities with curbside streetcar networks. For example, tram lanes in Zagreb can be used only by trams, buses, and taxicabs.

== Cycling ==
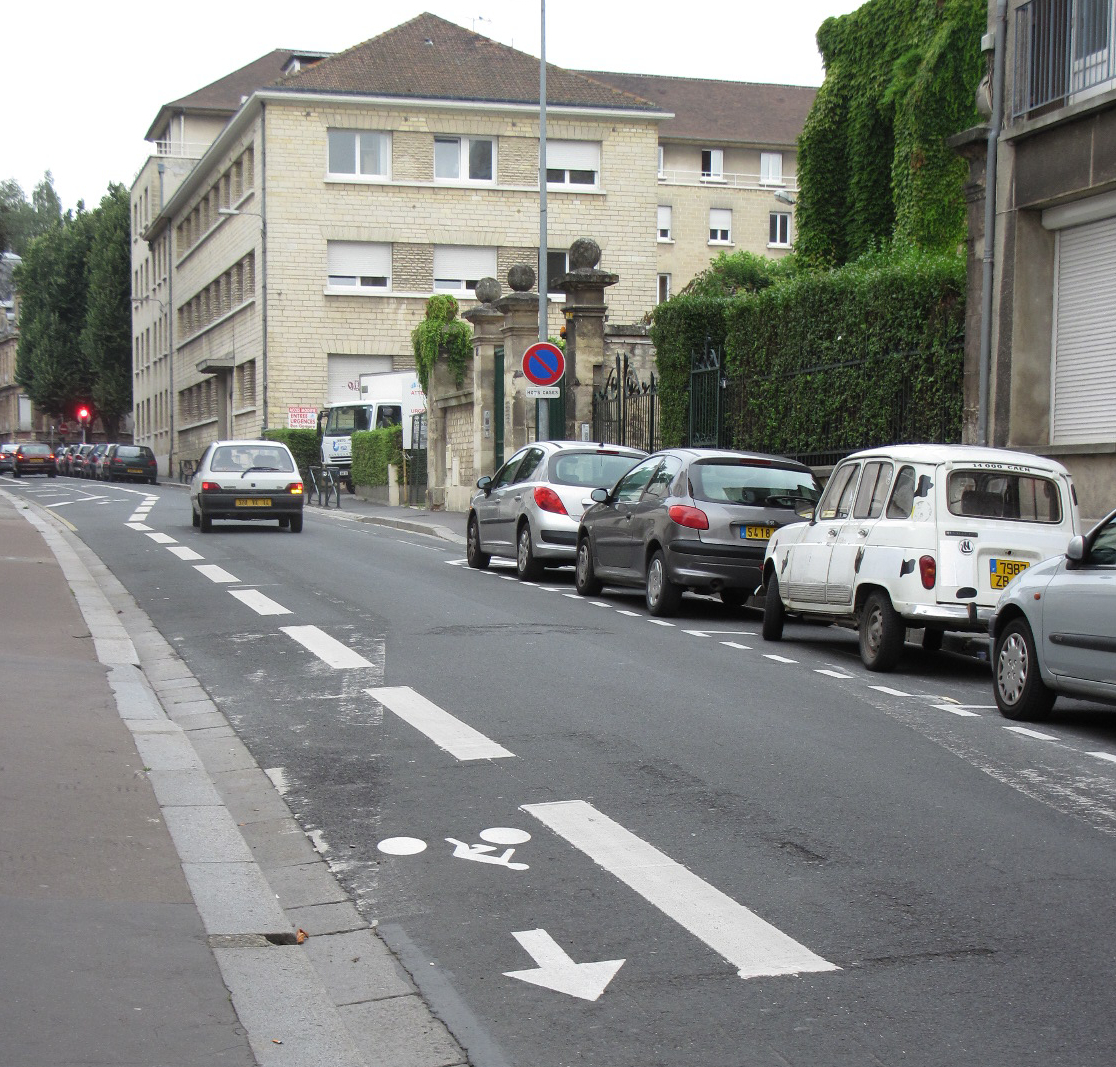
Bicycle contraflow lane in Caen, France

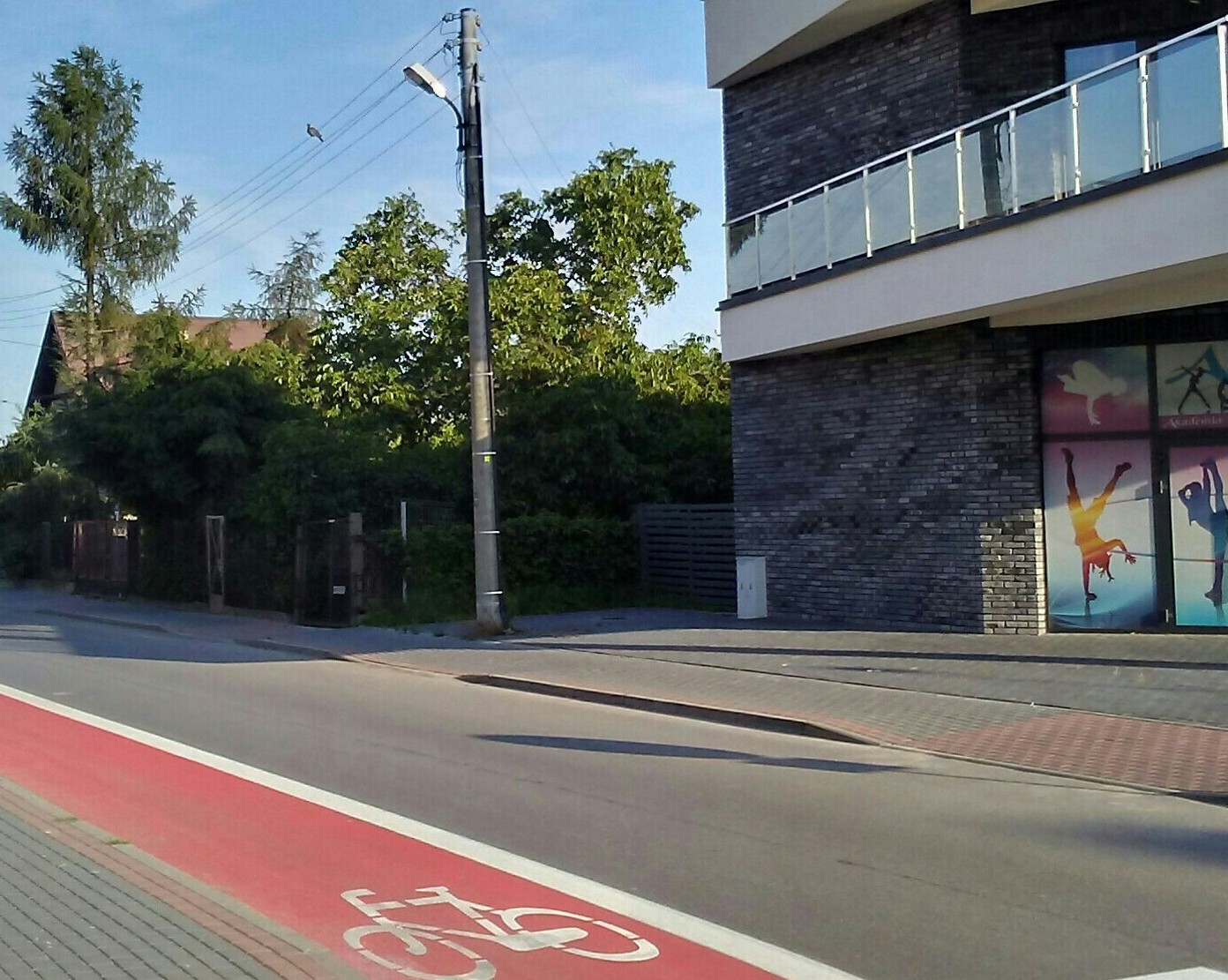
Contraflow lane for bicycles at Smugowa Street in Tomaszów Mazowiecki, Poland

Contraflow is a common part of cycling infrastructure and is often seen on one-way streets. A standard example is that car and other vehicular traffic might have only one lane while on both sides there are bike lanes; one going in the same direction as the vehicular traffic, the other (the contraflow bike lane) allows cyclists to safely go in the opposite direction to the cars. This is allowed as the road may not be wide enough for two lanes of car traffic but there is enough room to allow for the additional bicycle lane; and without it cyclists may be forced to take a long, and perhaps unsafe, detour.

Another example is the same as the above but there is only one bike lane, the contraflow lane, and bicycles travelling in the same direction as the cars share the cars' lane. This solution would be more suited to very narrow roads or ones with light traffic.

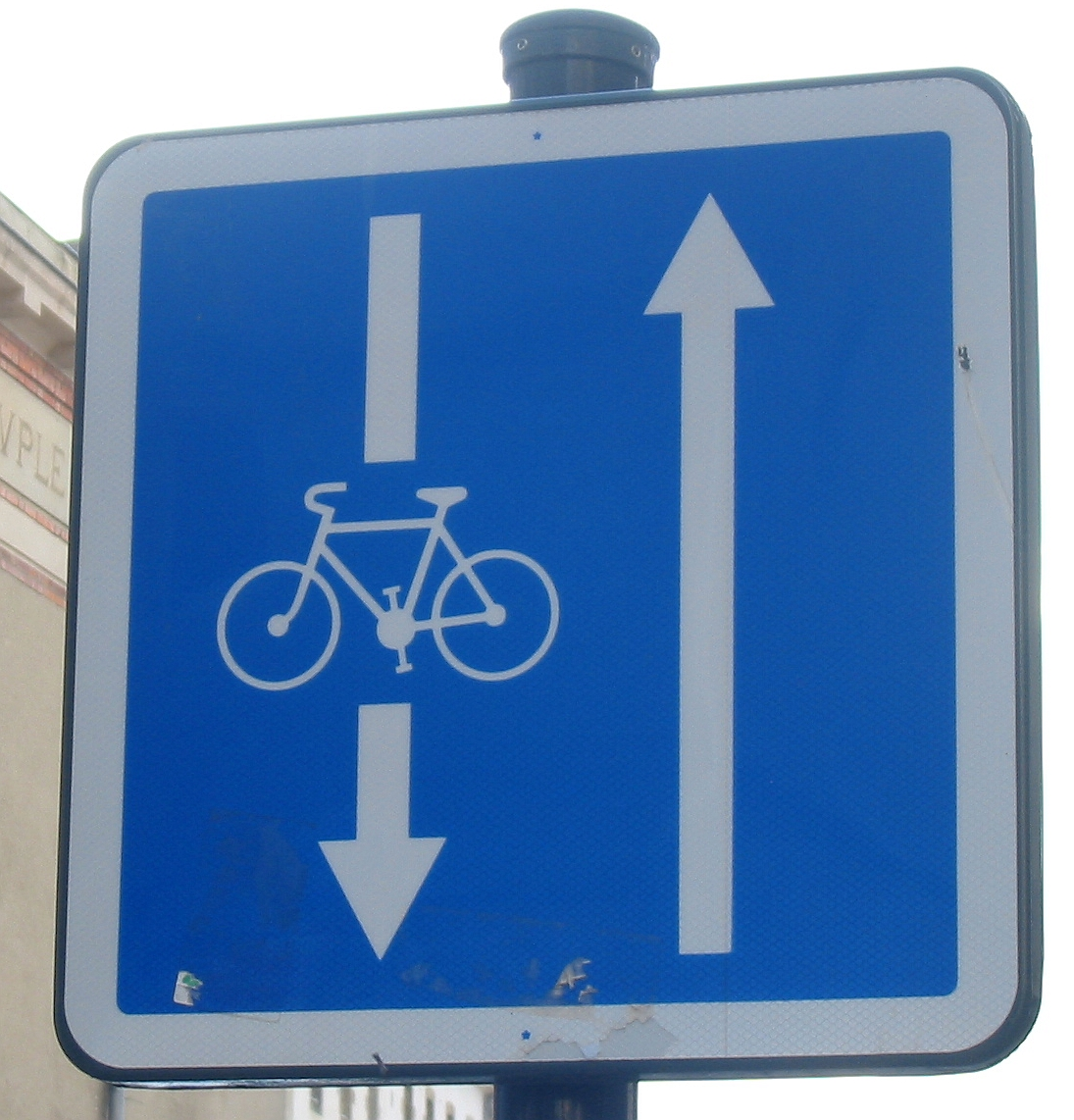
Roadsign in Rennes indicating a street which is one-way for motorised vehicles but two-way for bicycles

In Belgium since about 2005, and in France since 2010, the default position in towns has been for one-way streets to be available for cycling in either direction - for streets over 3 m wide and limited to 50 km/h or less in Belgium, for streets limited to 30 km/h or less in France. Contraflows are known in French as sens unique limité (SUL) in Belgium and double sens cyclable (DSC) in France. In this case, a contraflow cycle lane is often marked in paint, with dotted white lines and ideograms of a bicycle, either all the way along the street if busy, or more commonly just at junctions.

In the Netherlands, most one-way streets are two way for cyclists, although this is not always marked by a counterflow lane. This is presented as a 'one-way street, except for cyclists'. One-way streets that do not include contraflow for bicycles are rare and are usually only found as pairs of a single street (with very large median) that are too far apart to be presented as a single street. It is not uncommon for cyclists to fail to notice a one-way street that does include contraflow for bicycles, because they are too accustomed to all one-way streets including bicycles.

In the United Kingdom, it is standard since 2020 to encourage highway authorities to allow cycles to take a shorter and perhaps safer routes on narrow one-way residential streets. On streets with less than 1000 vehicles a day and a speed limit of 20 mph, contraflow lanes do not require lane markings where, although appear on upright signage. As part of new or improved one-way road layouts, contraflow cycle lanes should be considered.

In the United States, the town of Provincetown, Massachusetts on Cape Cod has long allowed cycling in both directions on its three-mile long main street, Commercial Street. There is no marked cycle lane. This unusual condition required special state legislation in 1977 to give the local government permission to set its own rules for the street.

Contraflow cycling is often assumed to be associated with higher accidents risks, but where it has been properly evaluated, contraflow cycling actually seems to reduce the accidents risk.

== See also ==
- Contraflow lane reversal
- Reversible lane
- Single track road
