= Evacuation simulation =

Evacuation simulation is a method to determine evacuation times for areas, buildings, or vessels. It is based on the simulation of crowd dynamics and pedestrian motion. The number of evacuation software have been increased dramatically in the last 25 years. A similar trend has been observed in term of the number of scientific papers published on this subject. One of the latest survey indicate the existence of over 70 pedestrian evacuation models. There are two conferences dedicated to this subject: Pedestrian Evacuation Dynamics and Human Behavior in Fire.

The distinction between buildings, ships, and vessels on the one hand and settlements and areas on the other hand is important for the simulation of evacuation processes. In the case of the evacuation of a whole district, the transport phase (see emergency evacuation) is usually covered by queueing models (see below).

Pedestrian evacuation simulation are popular in the fire safety design of building when a performance based approach is used. Simulations are not primarily methods for optimization. To optimize the geometry of a building or the procedure with respect to evacuation time, a target function has to be specified and minimized. Accordingly, one or several variables must be identified which are subject to variation.

A small-scale simulation run on FDS+Evac. The simulation is of a classroom.

== Classification of models ==
Modelling approaches in the field of evacuation simulation:

- Cellular automaton: discrete, microscopic models, where the pedestrian is represented by a cell state. In this case both statics and dynamic floor fields (i.e., distance maps) are used to navigate agents toward exits moving from a cell to adjacent cells which can have different shapes. There exist models for ship evacuation processes, bi-directional pedestrian flows, and general models with bionics aspects.
- Agent-based models: microscopic models, where the pedestrian is represented by an agent. The agents can have human attributes besides the coordinates. Their behavior can integrate stochastic nature. There exist general models with spatial aspects of pedestrian steps.
- Social Force Model: continuous, microscopic model, based on equations from physics
- Queuing models: macroscopic models which are based on the graphical representation of the geometry. The movement of the persons is represented as a flow on this graph.
- Particle swarm optimization models: microscopic model, based on a fitness function which minimizes some properties of the evacuation (distance between pedestrians, distance between pedestrians and exits)
- Fluid-dynamic models: continuous, macroscopic models, where large crowds are modeled with coupled, nonlinear, partial differential equations

== Simulation of evacuations ==
Buildings (train stations, sports stadia), ships, aircraft, tunnels, and trains are similar concerning their evacuation: the persons are walking towards a safe area. In addition, persons might use slides or similar evacuation systems and for ships the lowering of life-boats.

=== Tunnels ===
Tunnels are unique environments with their own specific characteristics: underground spaces, unknown to users, no natural light, etc. which affect different aspects of evacuees behaviours such as pre-evacuation times (e.g. occupants' reluctance to leave the vehicles), occupant–occupant and occupant–environment interactions, herding behaviour and exit selection.

=== Ships ===
Four aspects are particular for ship evacuation:

- Ratio of number of crew to number of passengers
- Ship motion
- Floating position
- The evacuation system (e.g., slides, life-boats)

Ship motion and/or abnormal floating position may decrease the ability to move. This influence has been investigated experimentally and can be taken into account by reduction factors.

The evacuation of a ship is divided into two separate phases: assembly phase and embarkation phase.

=== Aircraft ===
The American Federal Aviation Administration requires that aircraft must be able to be evacuated within 90 seconds. This criterion has to be checked before approval of the aircraft.

The 90-second rule requires the demonstration that all passengers and crew members can safely abandon the aircraft cabin in less than 90 seconds, with half of the usable exits blocked, with the minimum illumination provided by floor proximity lighting, and a certain age-gender mix in the simulated occupants.

The rule was established in 1965 with 120 seconds, and has evolved over the years to encompass the improvements in escape equipment, changes in cabin and seat material, and more complete and appropriate crew training.
