= Applied Research Associates =

Company in New Mexico, United States

Applied Research Associates, Inc
- Type: Private/Employee-Owned
- Industry: research and development (R&D), engineering consulting, management consulting, public sector consulting
- Founded: 1979
- Headquarters: Albuquerque, New Mexico, United States of America
- Key people: Curt Beckemeyer (CEO, President, and Director) William “Brother” Ratliff (COO, Vice President)
- Number of employees: ~2,300 (2023)
- Website: www.ara.com

Applied Research Associates Inc. (ARA), is an engineering, management, and public sector consulting firm and a research and development company headquartered in Albuquerque, New Mexico, founded in 1979. As of 2018, its revenue was estimated at between $100 and $750 million by The Washington Post. As of 2023, the company has over 2,300 employee-owners.

== History ==
The company was launched by Harry Auld and Neil Higgins in 1979. The company was originally named Higgins, Auld and Bratton Inc. Jimmie Bratton joined the company in 1980 and the name was changed to its current name, Applied Research Associates, Inc. (ARA).

In 2008, ARA assisted National Institute of Standards and Technology with their investigation into the collapse of original 7 World Trade Center in the September 11 attacks in 2001.

== Sub-divisions ==
- Analytic, Software, and Engineering Solutions
- Automation & Geosciences
- Security Engineering & Applied Sciences
- Software, Systems, and Modeling
- Transportation, Infrastructure, and Energy
- Klein Associates

== Research ==
- National Security
  - Integrated Munitions Effects Assessment (IMEA)
  - Nuclear Capabilities Services (NuCS)
  - Vulnerability Assessment and Protection Option (VAPO)
- Infrastructure
- Health Solutions
  - BioGears Human Physiology Engine
  - PTSD - A 2007-2008 pilot study by ARA found connections between traumatic brain injury and Posttraumatic stress disorder, contesting the notion that PTSD is primarily a psychological and not a physical affliction.
- Energy & Environment

== Products ==
- Aggregative Contingent Estimation System (ACES), a crowdsourcing platform funded by IARPA.
- ARC4, an augmented reality system used in defense applications.
- HURLOSS, a hurricane modelling system used in risk assessment.
- Modular Robotic Applique Kits (M-RAKs), robotic applique systems for ground vehicles.
- MRZR X unmanned ground vehicle with Polaris Inc. and Neya Systems.
- ReadiJet, a renewable biofuel developed with Chevron Lummus Global.
- SenseDefense hearing protection systems, a line of passive and hybrid active protectors including FiRes HP, ShotShields, HHP, and IEEP.
- Silent Sabre, a rifle-mounted directed-energy weapon.
