= CTLGroup =

Engineering, architectural, and materials-science firm based in the USA

- Company type: Engineering, Materials Science, Architecture, Consulting Firm, Laboratory
- Industry: Buildings & Facilities; Emergent Solutions; Energy & Resources; Green Solutions; Litigation & Insurance; Materials & Products; Transportation; Water & Wastewater
- Founded: 1986
- Headquarters: Skokie, Illinois, United States
- Number of locations: Skokie, IL (headquarters); New York, NY; Austin, TX; Bradenton, FL; Doha, State of Qatar; Washington, DC
- Area served: Global
- Key people: • Dennis M. McCann, Ph.D., P.E., President & COO • Richard Kaczkowski, P.E., S.E., Vice President • David Mizwicki, CFO
- Services: Building Performance Assessment, Building Infrastructure & Sustainability, Failure Investigation, Forensic Engineering, Mass Concrete Consulting, Materials Consulting Floor System Evaluation. Metallurgical & Mechanical Consulting, Pavement Consulting, Repair & Rehabilitation, Structural Engineering, Structural Evaluation, Structural Health Monitoring, Chemical Testing, Fatigue Testing, Mechanical Behavior Testing Nondestructive Testing, Petrography, Physical Testing, Sensors & Structural Monitoring
- Number of employees: 105
- Website: ctlgroup.com

CTLGroup is an engineering, architecture, and materials science firm that provides engineering, testing and scientific services in the following markets: Building & Facilities; Emergent Solutions; Energy & Resources; Litigation & Insurance; Materials & Products; and Transportation. Its staff includes professionals from the fields of civil, structural, mechanical engineering, architecture, geology, chemistry, ceramics and materials science. Serving clients from around the globe, CTLGroup maintains corporate offices and laboratories in Chicago (Skokie, Illinois) and Doha, State of Qatar and consulting offices in New York City, New York; Austin, TX; Bradenton, FL; and Washington, DC.

Services for clients in New York, Michigan, and North Carolina are provided through CTL Engineers & Construction Technology Consultants.

== Background ==
CTLGroup began in 1916 as the research and development laboratory for the Portland Cement Association (PCA), which had recently moved to Chicago. The PCA was formed to develop the use of portland cement in construction, which at the time had become the most common construction material. Demand for consulting grew over the years, eventually expanding into other building materials and engineering issues.

In 1986 CTLGroup became an independent firm, offering engineering, testing, and consulting services. First known as “Construction Technology Laboratories,” the firm changed its name to “CTLGroup” in 2005 to reflect the fact that it provides both laboratory services as well as engineering consulting services.

The firm's projects include involvement in the construction of the Burj Khalifa, the World Trade Center collapse investigation and work at the Stonecutters Bridge.

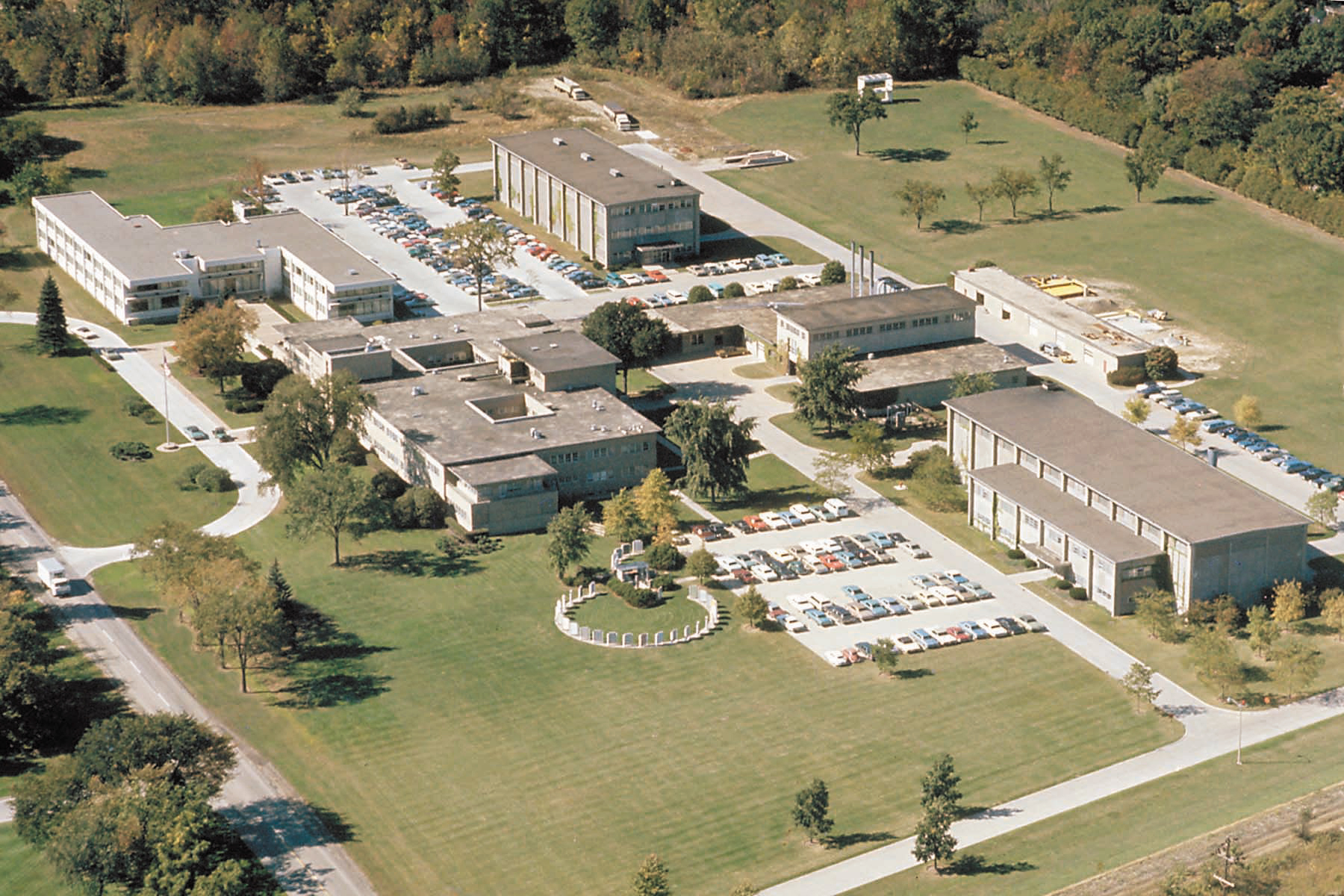
CTLGroup Headquarters

== History ==
=== 2000s ===
CTLGroup provides highly specialized creep and shrinkage testing for supertall buildings.

As construction projects rise above 984 feet, which is the minimum for supertall classification, precise calculations for creep and shrinkage become absolutely crucial. As a former research and development lab where the Pickett Effect and other important creep and shrinkage related theories and discoveries were made, CTLGroup was selected to perform much of the testing and consulting for numerous high profile projects, including the following: Trump Tower, Chicago; Al Hamra Tower, Kuwait; Freedom Tower, New York; Pentominium, Dubai; and the tallest building in the world, the Burj Khalifa, Dubai.

CTLGroup served as a contributor to the ASHRAE/USGBC/IES Standard 189.1 Standard for the Design of High Performance Green Buildings (since 2006) and ASHRAE 90.1 Energy Standard for Buildings Except Low-Rise Residential Buildings (since 1990).

In 2003 CTLGroup completed an award-winning concrete restoration on Frank Lloyd Wright's Unity Temple, a National Historical Landmark in Oak Park, Illinois. The firm continued work on in 2008 to restore the cantilevered south roof slab above the sanctuary of the temple.

In 2001 CTLGroup’s Dr. W. Gene Corley oversaw the initial FEMA investigation and subsequent report on the collapse of the World Trade Center on September 11th. His team found that the severity of the destruction was largely due to a lack of fireproofing in the building. The recommendations on structural fireproofing in Corley’s report were implemented throughout the industry.

=== 1990s ===
CTLGroup evaluated deterioration and repair recommendations in monument structures in Washington, D.C., including the Lincoln Memorial and Jefferson Memorial. The firm also measured panel movements and temperature changes to determine the cause of cracks in the vertical granite panels of the Vietnam Veterans Memorial at the request of the National Park Service.

CTLGroup led the industry in nondestructive testing (NDT) when NDT expert Allen Davis developed and promoted the Impulse Response (IR) technique, a stress wave test used to evaluate concrete conditions.

In 1995, W. Gene Corley, the “preeminent expert on building collapse investigations and building codes” led the investigation of the structural performance of the Alfred P. Murrah Federal Building in Oklahoma City, following the bombing there. He served as the head of the Building Performance Assessment Team (BPAT) which involved the American Society of Civil Engineers, as well as representatives from the Federal Emergency Management Agency (FEMA), the United States Army Corps of Engineers, the General Services Administration, and the National Institute of Standards and Technology.

=== 1980s ===
When CTLGroup first became an independent subsidiary of PCA in 1986, it expanded its scope of services beyond concrete and modified its structures laboratory to incorporate the testing of steel structures.

In 1986 NASA granted CTLGroup 40 grams of lunar soil, the largest amount ever awarded to industrial sectors. CTLGroup's experts, having studied the physical properties of concrete made with lunar soil, also referred to as lunarcrete, had conceived of building space stations and other structures on the moon using lunar soil. In their research the lunar material was conceived as a cementitious substitute that would help minimize supplies to be brought to the moon for a given construction project. The biggest obstacle to developing it on the moon, however, is that there is little usable hydrogen on the moon, and therefore no water with which to make concrete.
