= W. Gene Corley =

American structural engineer (1935–2013)

Dr. W. Gene Corley, P.E. (December 19, 1935 – March 1, 2013) was an American structural engineer and "preeminent expert on building collapse investigations and building codes." Corley was the Senior Vice President of CTLGroup from 1987 to 2013, where he led structural engineering projects, including numerous evaluations of buildings and structures damaged by earthquake, explosions, and from terrorist attacks. He led the investigation of structural performance of the Murrah Building following the Oklahoma City bombing in 1995, and the World Trade Center Building Performance Study in 2001–2002 following the September 11 attacks. He died on March 1, 2013. He was 77.

== Background ==
Corley was educated at the University of Illinois at Urbana-Champaign, earning a B.S. in Civil Engineering in 1958, and a Ph.D. in Structural Engineering in 1961. He was a licensed as a Structural Engineer in Illinois. He was also a Registered Civil Engineer and Registered Professional Engineer in numerous other states. He was a frequent seminar speaker at his alma mater on topics ranging from structural failure investigations to professional licensure. In 1970, he shared the American Concrete Institute's Wason Medal for Materials Research with Neil M. Hawkins for their article, "Shearhead Reinforcement Slabs."

From 1987 to 2013, Corley was the Senior Vice President of CTLGroup where he led structural engineering projects and investigations of structural failure.

== Consulting ==
=== Oklahoma City bombing ===
Corley led the Building Performance Assessment Team (BPAT), which conducted an investigation of the structural performance of the Alfred P. Murrah Federal Building in Oklahoma City, following the bombing there in 1995. The BPAT was established three weeks after the bombing, which involved the American Society of Civil Engineers, as well as representatives from the Federal Emergency Management Agency (FEMA), the United States Army Corps of Engineers, the General Services Administration, and the National Institute of Standards and Technology. They found that the Murrah Building could have performed much better, if it had been constructed to standards used in earthquake-prone areas, with special reinforcing of key columns. The way the building was designed made it vulnerable to "a chain reaction of successive failures." Nonetheless, they pointed out that the Murrah Building met all government requirements that were in place, at the time the building was constructed in 1974.

Corley explained about the design of the Murrah Building, "if a critical element fails, it may start a chain reaction of successive failures that collapses the whole building. "A majority of the fatalities were caused not by the force of the bomb blast itself, but by the progressive collapse of the building's floors which depended on the support of a few key columns that the bomb destroyed."

Findings and recommendations from the BPAT investigation were released in a report in November 1995. The findings led to revised security, building design, and blast protection requirements for new federal government buildings.

=== World Trade Center collapse investigation ===
Corley served as the lead investigator on the FEMA World Trade Center Building Performance Study, following the September 11 attacks. This preliminary investigation was initially organized by the Structural Engineers Institute (SEI) of the American Society of Civil Engineers, with the American Institute of Steel Construction, the American Concrete Institute, the National Fire Protection Association, and the Society of Fire Protection Engineers also involved. ASCE also invited FEMA to join the investigation, which later became a joint ASCE-FEMA effort. The investigative team released its report on the collapse of the World Trade Center in May 2002. The National Institute of Standards and Technology (NIST) followed up with a multi-year investigation into the collapse of the World Trade Center and 7 World Trade Center, as mandated by the 2002 National Construction Safety Team Act, which resulted recommendations for improving structural fire protection, life safety, and engineering practice.

=== Other projects ===
Other projects he has led include an investigation into the April 1982 collapse of a highway ramp under construction, which killed 13 workers, in East Chicago, Indiana, damage to the Los Angeles Civic Center and other buildings, following the 1994 Northridge earthquake, damage to the Humberto Vidal Building in San Juan, Puerto Rico following a gas explosion, and damage investigation to structures following tornadoes in Kansas and Oklahoma. Corley also investigated the collapse of a ten-story parking garage under construction at the Tropicana Casino Resort in Atlantic City, which occurred on October 30, 2003.
