= NIST World Trade Center Disaster Investigation =

Post-disaster report

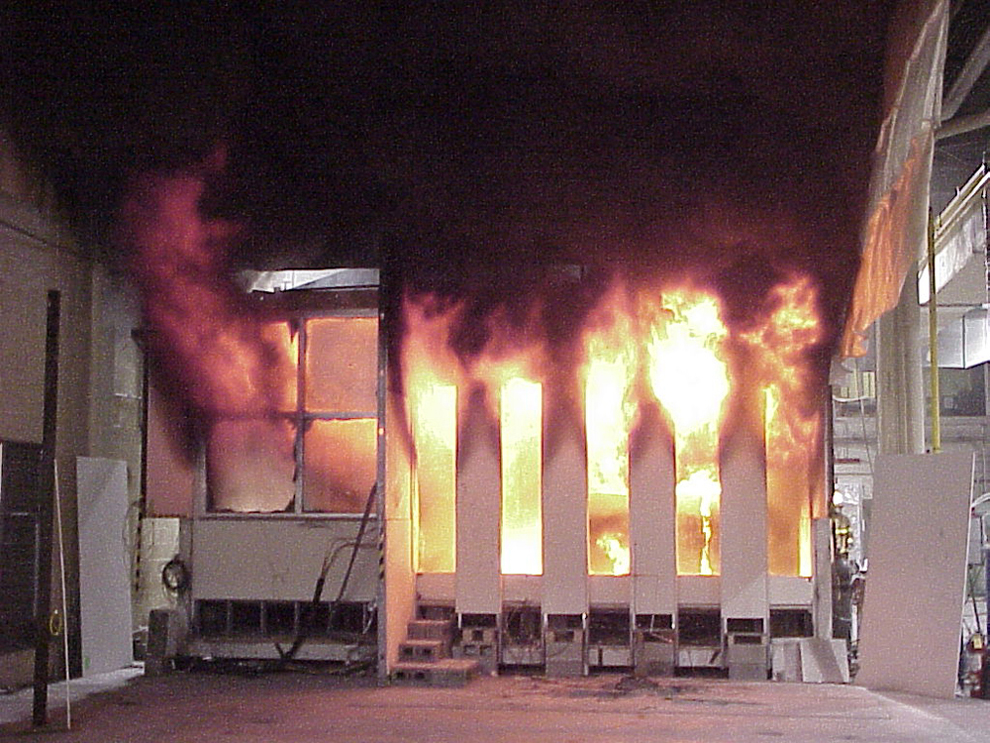
NIST experiment to replicate an office fire in the World Trade Center. Tests such as this helped validate computer models of the spread rate and intensity of the fires initiated by jet fuel and fed by the office furnishings and other combustibles. Video thumbnail shows fire test of mockup WTC office environment with multiple workstations.

The NIST World Trade Center Disaster Investigation was a report that the National Institute of Standards and Technology (NIST) conducted to establish the likely technical causes of the three building failures that occurred at the World Trade Center following the September 11, 2001, terrorist attacks. The report was mandated as part of the National Construction Safety Team Act (NCST Act), which was signed into law on October 1, 2002 by President George W. Bush. NIST issued its final report on the collapse of the World Trade Center's North and South towers in September 2005, and the agency issued its final report on 7 World Trade Center in November 2008.

NIST concluded that the collapse of each tower resulted from the combined effects of airplane impact damage, widespread fireproofing dislodgment, and the fires that ensued. The sequence of failures that NIST concluded initiated the collapse of both towers involved the heat-induced sagging of floor trusses pulling some of the exterior columns on one side of each tower inward until they buckled, after which instability rapidly spread and the upper sections then fell onto the floors below. 7 World Trade Center, which was never directly hit by an airplane, collapsed as a result of thermal expansion of steel beams and girders that were heated by uncontrolled fires caused by the collapse of the North Tower and failure of the fire-resistive material.

== Context ==
=== Collapse of the World Trade Center ===
During the September 11 attacks, two hijacked jet airliners struck the Twin Towers of the World Trade Center (WTC), one to each tower. As a result, the two 110 stories-tall skyscrapers collapsed, causing complete destruction to the entire WTC complex and killing 2,763 people. The South Tower collapsed at 9:59 a.m. Eastern Daylight Time after burning for approximately 56 minutes. 29 minutes later, the North Tower collapsed having burned for 102 minutes. When the North Tower collapsed, debris fell on the nearby 7 World Trade Center, damaging it and starting fires that burned for almost seven hours, compromising the building's structural integrity. 7 World Trade Center collapsed at 5:21 p.m.

The collapse of the World Trade Center was unprecedented; never before had a steel-framed multi-story building suffered a complete collapse as a result of fire. In the immediate aftermath, knowledgeable structural engineers began providing a range of explanations in an attempt to help the public understand these tragic events. However, a coordinated effort would need to be organized to investigate and analyze the complex series of events that led to each collapse.

=== FEMA World Trade Center Building Performance Study ===
In the aftermath of the attacks, researchers responded immediately by traveling to the World Trade Center site where they began collecting data. Among the first were members of the Federal Emergency Management Agency (FEMA) and American Society of Civil Engineers (ASCE), who together formed a Building Performance Study Team to understand how the building structures failed and why. The team produced the first official government report attempting to explain the destruction of the World Trade Center complex.

They were able to make many observations and findings, including preliminary analysis of the damaged structures, analysis of the buildings' fire suppression systems, and recommendations to building codes and fire standards for including airplane impact into building design. FEMA's final report, FEMA 403 issued in May 2002, titled World Trade Center Building Performance Study: Data Collection, Preliminary Observations, and Recommendations, also provided a substantial amount of data about the event not documented elsewhere. Their findings suggested that fires, in conjunction with damage to the structural members and fire suppression systems inflicted by the jet airliners, played a key role in the collapse of the buildings.

However, the team's investigation was hampered by a number of issues. The lack of authority of investigators to impound pieces of steel for examination before they were recycled led to the loss of important pieces of evidence that were destroyed early during the search and rescue effort, and much of the steel had already been recycled in the one month that had lapsed between the attack and the deployment of the team. The team was further impeded by ongoing criminal investigations by the FBI and NTSB. In a hearing to the U.S. House of Representatives' Committee on Science on March 6, 2002, a panel of witnesses and experts described the obstacles as:

- No clear authority and the absence of an effective protocol for how the building performance investigators should conduct and coordinate their investigation with the concurrent search and rescue efforts, as well as any criminal investigation
- Difficulty obtaining documents essential to the investigation, including blueprints, design drawings, and maintenance records
- Uncertainty as a result of the confidential nature of the BPAT study
- Uncertainty as to the strategy for completing the investigation and applying the lessons learned

Because of these inadequacies, the Building Performance Study team could not "definitively determine the sequence of events leading to the collapse of each tower." The report was remarkably blunt in pointing out shortcomings and missteps in the investigation and its recommendation for another, more thorough and authoritative investigation.

=== National Construction Safety Team act ===
As a result of the inconclusive FEMA Building Performance Study team's findings and concerns over missteps in its investigation, the U.S. House of Representatives drafted legislation that would give wide powers, including the right to issue subpoenas, to teams investigating building failures. The bill also mandated that the teams would be centered at the National Institute of Standards and Technology (NIST) whose building and fire research laboratory in Maryland had conducted extensive investigations of building failures in the past. The bill, cited as the National Construction Safety Team (NCST) act, passed the House and the Senate and was signed into law on Oct. 1, 2002 by President George W. Bush.

The NCST act gives NIST a clear mandate to:

1. establish the likely technical cause of building failures;
2. evaluate the technical aspects of procedures used for evacuation and emergency response;
3. recommend specific changes to building codes, standards, and practices;
4. recommend any research or other appropriate actions needed to improve the structural safety of buildings; and/or changes in emergency response and evacuation procedures; and,
5. make final recommendations within 90 days of completing an investigation.

== Investigation ==
NIST began its investigation on August 21st 2002. Prior to this date, volunteers from NIST, FEMA, ASCE and others collected steel members important to the investigation from the four steel recycling facilities during the recovery effort. They collected and cataloged 236 steel artifacts, including exterior columns, core columns, floor trusses and other similar structural members. They were able to observe the metallurgical chemistry and structure and perform experiments on the recovered elements to measure their attributes such as mechanical properties under high temperatures.

NIST's Building and Fire Research Laboratory created a complex computer model to understand the collapse of the towers. Specifically, they wanted to know if the collapse of a core column could cause the progressive collapse of the whole building. They also modeled the dispersion of the jet fuel and damage to the interior of the building that was not visible from photographic evidence and eyewitnesses. The model was used to understand the hypothesis of the collapse.

== Findings ==
=== Twin Towers ===
NIST computer simulation of the AA11 aircraft impact in World Trade Center Twin Towers (WTC 1)

The investigation team integrated their metallurgy analysis, experimental results and computer simulation with video and photographs of the destruction and eyewitness accounts to form their understanding for how the buildings collapsed. They came to two conclusions:

1. A conventional fire should not have caused the collapse of the 110-story skyscrapers in the absence of structural and fire-proofing insulation damage.
2. The towers would likely not have collapsed if not for the impact and damage that the aircraft caused to the fire-proofing insulation.

The most probable collapse sequence was similar between the South Tower and North Tower, but they were not identical. However, they both involved all major structural systems of the building design: the core columns, the exterior columns and the building floors.

1. First, the floors that lost fire-proofing insulation due to debris impact began to sag as a result of the high temperature of the fire.
2. The sagging floors pulled inward on the walls
3. The exterior walls began to bow inward under the combined forces of the sagging floors, the fire, and the severed core columns from aircraft impact damage.
4. Finally, the exterior walls buckled/caved in and the buildings collapsed. The stories below provided little resistance to the relatively tremendous energy of the falling building, allowing them to fall very quickly.

The NIST investigation's conclusions do not support the "pancake theory" of collapse initiation, in which the collapse is begun by a progressive failure of the floor system. However, "pancaking" was accepted as the mode of collapse progression.

=== 7 World Trade Center ===
NIST released the final report of their investigation into the collapse of the 47-story World Trade Center 7 building on 20 August 2008.

Their conclusion is that WTC7 collapsed primarily as a result of the fire that was started when the WTC1 collapsed. The collapse of the North Tower also damaged the south exterior wall of WTC7 but it was not a contributing factor. Because FDNY could not attempt to extinguish the fires that were burning on six floors of the building, the fire-proofing insulation began to fail. After several hours of uncontrolled fire, the steel columns, girders and trusses absorbed heat and rapidly lost their strength. As they began to sag, deform and buckle, the interior structure below the east penthouse was brought down. The failed core columns' load was distributed to the remaining columns which all failed. This led to the progressive collapse of the building.

== Reforms ==
The National Construction Safety Team Act of 2002, which mandated NIST to perform its investigation, specifically states that NIST, which is not a regulatory agency, is not authorized to require the adoption of building codes, standards or practices. However, NIST's final reports on the collapse of the WTC buildings provides the technical basis for new and improved standards, codes and practices on designing buildings to resist progressive collapse. Many NIST researchers are also key members of professional, standards-developing organizations, and NIST actively works with these organizations to ensure that lessons learned from investigations are put to use.

=== Fire Protection of Structural Members ===
The National Fire Protection Association has adopted many of NIST's recommended improvements to the building code. NIST's recommendation for improving a building's structural frame and support system under severe loading conditions, such as during a fire event, resulted in the adoption of a new approach to high-rise building design. Much more scrutiny is to be given to the primary and secondary structural members as well as the connections that tie them together.

The steel columns of the WTC buildings significantly lost strength when they were subjected to the heat of the fire. Concrete heated to the same temperature, however, loses no strength at all. As a result, new high-rise buildings, including One World Trade Center, are being constructed with reinforced, high-strength concrete.

=== Emergency Communication Systems ===
Due to the fact that New York City's Office of Emergency Management was located in 7 World Trade Center on the day of the attacks and vital communications equipment was located in the North Tower, their response was significantly impeded. They have since moved their offices to Brooklyn, and disaster and emergency management teams around the country are also moving away from possible targets of terrorist attacks, natural disasters and other emergency scenarios.

== List of reports released ==
- Final Reports from the NIST World Trade Center Investigation (September 2005, November 2008)
  - NIST NCSTAR 1: Federal Building and Fire Safety Investigation of the World Trade Center Disaster: Final Report of the National Construction Safety Team on the Collapses of the World Trade Center Tower
  - NIST NCSTAR 1-1: Design, Construction, and Maintenance of Structural and Life Safety Systems
    - NIST NCSTAR 1-1A: Design and Construction of Structural Systems
      - NIST NCSTAR 1-1A appendixes A-B
      - NIST NCSTAR 1-1A appendixes C-G
    - NIST NCSTAR 1-1B: Comparison of Building Code Structural Requirements
    - NIST NCSTAR 1-1C: Maintenance and Modifications to Structural Systems
      - NIST NCSTAR 1-1C appendixes
    - NIST NCSTAR 1-1D: Fire Protection and Life Safety Provisions Applied to the Design and Construction of World Trade Center 1, 2, and 7 and Post-Construction Provisions Applied after Occupancy
    - NIST NCSTAR 1-1E: Comparison of Codes, Standards, and Practices in Use at the Time of the Design and Construction of World Trade Center 1, 2, and 7
    - NIST NCSTAR 1-1F: Comparison of the 1968 and Current (2003) New York City Building Code Provisions
    - NIST NCSTAR 1-1G: Amendments to the Fire Protection and Life Safety Provisions of the New York City Building Code by Local Laws Adopted while World Trade Center 1, 2, and 7 Were in Use
    - NIST NCSTAR 1-1H: Post-Construction Modification to Fire Protection and Life Safety Systems of the World Trade Center Towers
    - NIST NCSTAR 1-1I: Post-Construction Modifications to Fire Protection, Life Safety, and Structural Systems of World Trade Center 7
    - NIST NCSTAR 1-1J: Design, Installation, and Operation of Fuel Systems for Emergency Power in World Trade Center 7
  - NIST NCSTAR 1-2: Baseline Structural Performance and Aircraft Impact Damage Analysis of the World Trade Center Towers
    - NIST NCSTAR 1-2A: Reference Structural Models and Baseline Performance Analysis of the World Trade Center Towers
    - NIST NCSTAR 1-2B: Analysis of Aircraft Impacts into the World Trade Center Towers (Chapters 1-8)
      - NIST NCSTAR 1-2B: Chapters 9-11
      - NIST NCSTAR 1-2B: appendixes
  - NIST NCSTAR 1-3: Mechanical and Metallurgical Analysis of Structural Steel
    - NIST NCSTAR 1-3A: Contemporaneous Structural Steel Specifications
    - NIST NCSTAR 1-3B: Steel Inventory and Identification
    - NIST NCSTAR 1-3C: Damage and Failure Modes of Structural Steel Components
      - NIST NCSTAR 1-3C: appendixes
    - NIST NCSTAR 1-3D: Mechanical Properties of Structural Steels
    - NIST NCSTAR 1-3E: Physical Properties of Structural Steels
  - NIST NCSTAR 1-4: Active Fire Protection Systems
    - NIST NCSTAR 1-4A: Post-Construction Fires prior to September 11, 2001
    - NIST NCSTAR 1-4B: Fire Suppression Systems
    - NIST NCSTAR 1-4C: Fire Alarm Systems
    - NIST NCSTAR 1-4D: Smoke Management Systems
  - NIST NCSTAR 1-5: Reconstruction of the Fires in the World Trade Center Towers
    - NIST NCSTAR 1-5A: Visual Evidence, Damage Estimates, and Timeline Analysis (Chapters 1-8)
      - NIST NCSTAR 1-5A: Chapters 9-appendix C
      - NIST NCSTAR 1-5A: appendixes D-G
      - NIST NCSTAR 1-5A: appendixes H-M
    - NIST NCSTAR 1-5B: Experiments and Modeling of Structural Steel Elements Exposed to Fire
    - NIST NCSTAR 1-5C: Fire Tests of Single Office Workstations
    - NIST NCSTAR 1-5D: Reaction of Ceiling Tile Systems to Shocks
    - NIST NCSTAR 1-5E: Experiments and Modeling of Multiple Workstations Burning in a Compartment
    - NIST NCSTAR 1-5F: Computer Simulation of the Fires in the World Trade Center Towers
    - NIST NCSTAR 1-5G: Fire Structure Interface and Thermal Response of the World Trade Center Towers
  - NIST NCSTAR 1-6: Structural Fire Response and Probable Collapse Sequence of the World Trade Center Towers
    - NIST NCSTAR 1-6A: Passive Fire Protection
    - NIST NCSTAR 1-6B: Fire Resistance Tests of the Floor Truss Systems
    - NIST NCSTAR 1-6C: Component, Connection, and Subsystem Structural Analysis
    - NIST NCSTAR 1-6D: Global Structural Analysis of the Response of the World Trade Center Towers to Impact Damage and Fire
  - NIST NCSTAR 1-7: Occupant Behavior, Egress, and Emergency Communication
    - NIST NCSTAR 1-7A: Analysis of Published Accounts of the World Trade Center Evacuation
    - NIST NCSTAR 1-7B: Technical Documentation for Survey Administration: Questionnaires, Interviews, and Focus Groups
  - NIST NCSTAR 1-8: The Emergency Response Operations
    - NIST NCSTAR 1-8: Appendixes A-L
  - NIST NCSTAR 1A: Final Report on the Collapse of World Trade Center Building 7 *
    - NIST NCSTAR 1-9: Structural Fire Response and Probable Collapse Sequence of World Trade Center Building 7, Volume 1 and 2 *
      - NIST NCSTAR 1-9A: Global Structural Analysis of the Response of World Trade Center Building 7 to Fires and Debris Impact Damage *
    - * Errata for NIST NCSTAR 1A, NIST NCSTAR 1-9, and NIST NCSTAR 1-9A (January 2009, April 2012, and June 2012)
- Draft Reports from the NIST World Trade Center Investigation - and public comments (April 2005 and August 2008)
- Best Practice Guidelines for Structural Fire Resistance Design of Concrete and Steel Buildings (NIST IR 7563, November 2010)
- June 2004 Progress Report on the Federal Building and Fire Safety Investigation of the World Trade Center (NIST SP 1000-5, June 2004)
- Public Update on the Federal Building and Fire Safety Investigation of the World Trade Center Disaster (NIST SP 1000-4, December 2003)
- Progress Report on the Federal Building and Fire Safety Investigation of the World Trade Center Disaster (NIST SP 1000-3, May 2003)
- Progress Report on NIST Building and Fire Investigation into the World Trade Center Disaster (NIST IR 6942 and NIST SP 1000-2, December 2002)
- NIST Final Plan: National Building and Fire Safety Investigation of the World Trade Center Disaster (NIST SP 1000-1, August 2002)
- Initial Model for Fires in the World Trade Center Towers (NIST IR 6879, May 2002)

== See also ==
- 9/11 Commission Report
- 9/11 Public Discourse Project
