= Eduardo Kausel =

Eduardo Kausel is a Chilean-born, American engineering scientist who has made significant contributions in the fields of soil dynamics, structural dynamics, wave propagation, and engineering mechanics.

== Education, career, academic positions ==
Kausel earned his first professional degree in 1967 from the University of Chile, graduating as a civil engineer with "Distinción Unánime" (summa cum laude), after which he joined the planning department at ENDESA, Chile's main electrical utility. In 1969, he travelled to Germany and carried out post-graduate studies at the Technical University of Darmstadt. A year later he moved to the United States and earned his Master of Science (1972) as well as Doctor of Science (1974) degrees from the Massachusetts Institute of Technology. Following graduation from MIT, Kausel worked in the industry at Stone and Webster Engineering Corporation in Boston until 1978, when he joined the faculty at MIT. He has remained there since and is currently a Professor of Civil and Environmental Engineering.

Kausel is also an adjunct lecturer at Rose School, an Italian educational institution affiliated with the Institute for Advanced Study of Pavia (IUSS) together with the Università degli Studi di Pavia. He also runs an engineering consulting firm specializing in structural mechanics, is a registered professional engineer in Massachusetts (R. No. 27976) and a member of the board of directors of Atlantica Yield, a publicly traded English-Spanish investment company focusing on renewable energy, power generation, electric transmission and water purification.

== Research contributions and impact ==
Kausel is best known for his work on dynamic soil-structure interaction, and for his role in the development of the thin-layer method, a numerical tool used for the analysis of wave propagation in laminated media which now lies at the heart of widely used computer programs such as SASSI. He also holds a patent from the US Patent Office, has published three books, and has written well over two hundred technical papers and reports in the areas of structural dynamics, earthquake engineering, and computational mechanics.

At the beginning of the 21st century he achieved some notoriety with two papers on the 911 terrorist attacks, which led to cover page articles in The New York Times , a commentary in Scientific American, TV interviews, and participation in documentaries on the causes of the collapse of the World Trade Center and on the speed of the aircraft, produced by British TV. Since then that work has often been the target of 9/11 conspiracy theorists who insist instead on alternative explanations. Ultimately, Kausel's early explanations in 2001 on the causes of the WTC collapse were largely corroborated by a comprehensive and detailed study reported by NIST in 2005.

== Honors and awards ==
Among the honors Kausel has received are a 1989 Japanese Government Research Award for Foreign Specialists from the Science and Technology Agency; the 1993 Southwest Mechanics Lecture Series lecturer; an Honorary Faculty Member in Epsilon Chi since 1992 (of only 2 in his department); the 1994 Konrad Zuse Guest Professorship at the University of Hamburg in Germany; the 1997 Emilio Rosenblueth Memorial Lecturer in Mexico City; the Humboldt Prize from the German Government in 2000; the 2001 MIT-CEE Award for Conspicuously Effective Teaching; and in 2015 he was elected Corresponding Member of the Chilean Academy of Engineering. He is also a Fellow and a Life Member of the American Society of Civil Engineers (ASCE), and is senior member of various other professional organizations, including the Seismological Society of America.
