= Architecture of the Cucuteni–Trypillia culture =

Remains of an ancient Eastern European society

The Chalcolithic Cucuteni-Trypillia culture, in Eastern Europe, left behind thousands of settlement ruins, c. 6000 to 3500 BC, containing a wealth of archaeological artifacts attesting to their cultural and technological characteristics.

== Construction techniques ==
The houses of the Cucuteni-Trypillia settlements were constructed in several general ways:

- Wattle-and-daub homes.
- Log houses.
- Semi-underground homes called bordei.

Some Cucuteni-Trypillia homes were two storeys tall, and evidence shows that the members of this culture sometimes decorated the outsides of their homes with many of the same complex red-ochre swirling designs that are to be found on their pottery. Most houses had thatched roofs and wooden floors covered with clay.

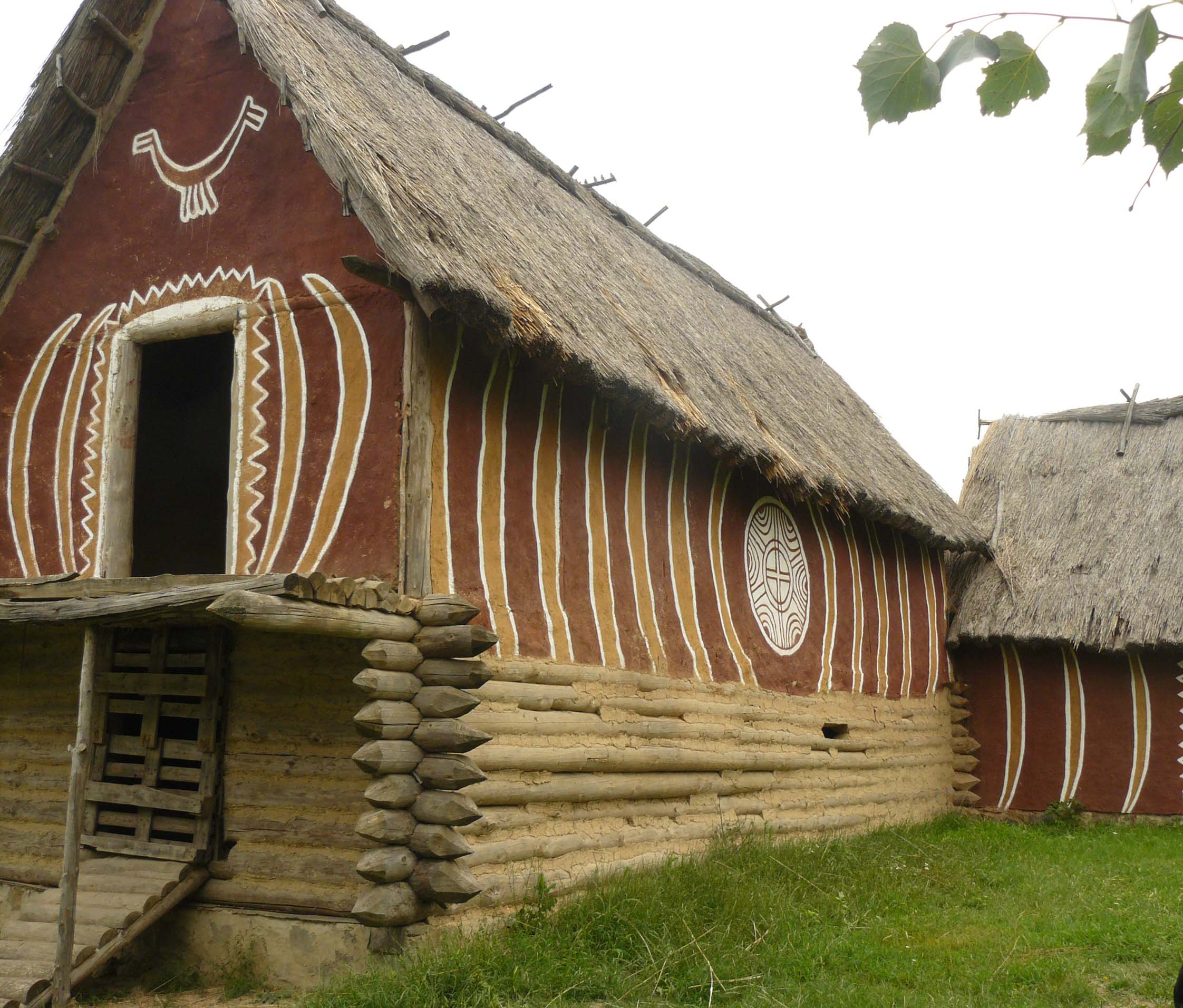
Reconstruction of a Cucuteni–Trypillian house.

Archaeologists have identified two types of house framing found at Cucuteni-Trypillia sites. One type, somewhat resembling the post and beam style, used evenly distributed fork-shaped log pillars that were partially sunk vertically into the ground so that the fork was located at the top and supported the roof beams above. The other type of framing used vertical beams measuring 15–20 cmin diameter (5.9–7.9 in), or greater, which rested on horizontal ground-sill foundational timbers that were in turn fixed in place on top of the soil.

Most of the walls were built in the wattle-and-daub style. The construction of these houses first started by erecting the framework of larger timbers in place (photo 1), which would take the weight of the structure, and then the space between these timbers would be filled in with a "wattle" made of pliable smaller branches and vines woven together to form a thin twiggy latticed net which was then affixed to the sturdy timbers (photo 2). Onto this wattle framework the "daub" would be applied made of mostly dampened clay soil although sometimes mixed with small bits of straw and/or animal dung to help keep its structural integrity (photo 3). The daub had to be applied with some force against the wattle in order for it to partially push through the twiggy framework, to which it would stick. Sometimes there would only be a single layer of wattle, and at other times two wattle layers would be used; one for the interior and another for the exterior of the wall. Daub was applied on both sides of the wall, inside and out (photo 4), creating a finished wall that was usually about 5 cm (2 in) thick. Once applied it was smoothed before drying to create an air- and water-tight barrier against the elements (photo 5). After the daub was fully dried, it was usually painted with lime to prevent infestations of pests.(note: the photographic examples used in this paragraph were taken from the web page "Recreating a Cucuteni dwelling-house", hosted by The Archaeological Park Cucuteni, see "External links" at bottom of this article)

Sometimes the walls were made of horizontally laid timbers (similar to log houses) that were then covered with clay daub. Some examples have been found where the horizontal timbers were in turn covered with a wattle-and-daub layer. At other times the horizontal timbers would be covered with a layer of primitively finished lumber. There was no standard practice in building walls there during Neolithic times; sometimes, even in the same house, walls would be constructed with horizontal timbers while others would be covered with finished lumber or wattle-and-daub.

Cucuteni-Trypillia houses were roofed with live turf or thatched reeds. The shape of the house was usually rectangular but some were laid out in an "L" shape. Some of the houses were divided into separate rooms while others contained a semi-open functional space, or atrium. Many of the Cucuteni-Trypillia houses were two stories high.

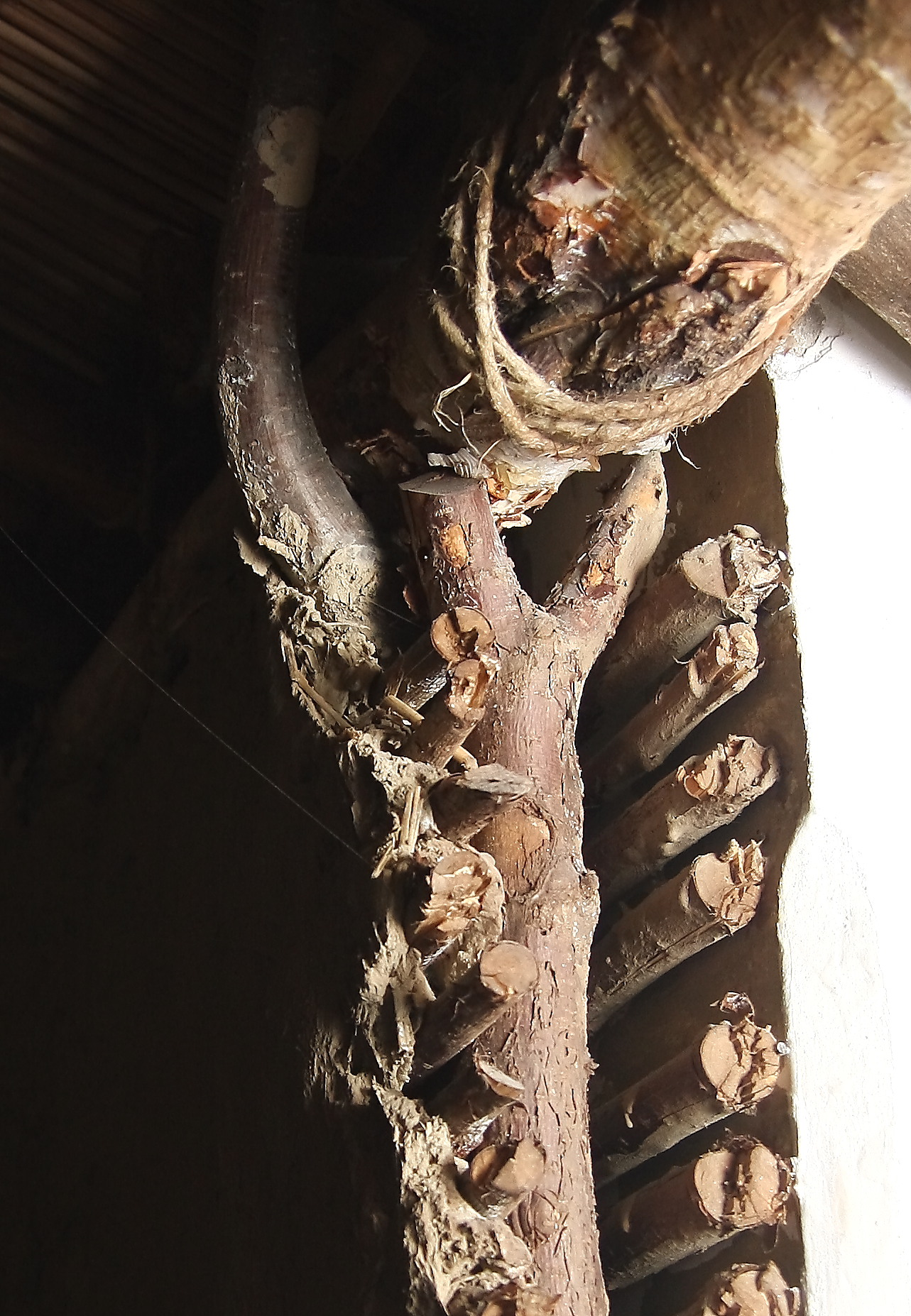
Detail of a fork pillar holding a roof beam, with wattle-and-daub layers revealed

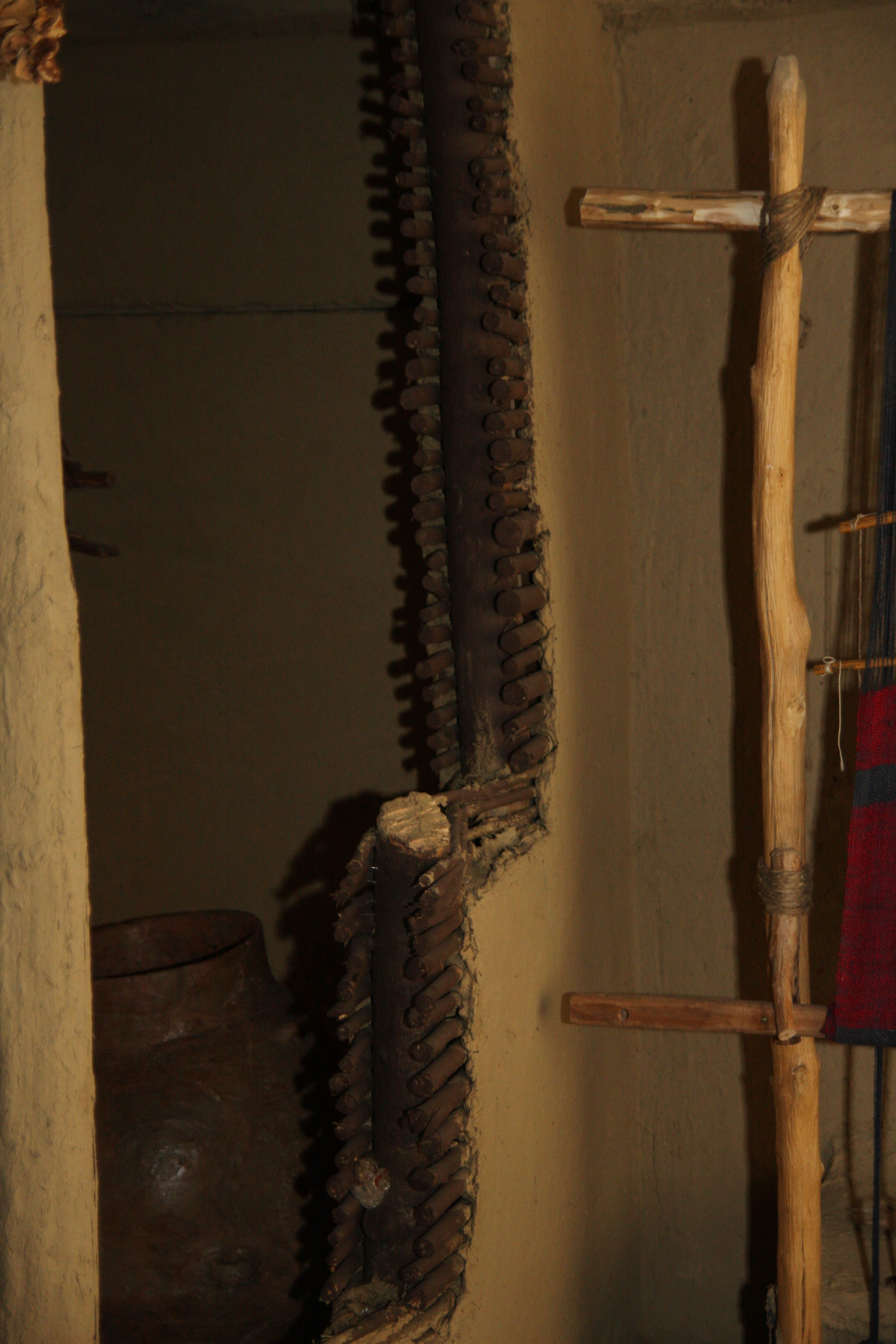
Wall reconstruction showing a wall with two layers of wattle and daub laid over a timber frame post

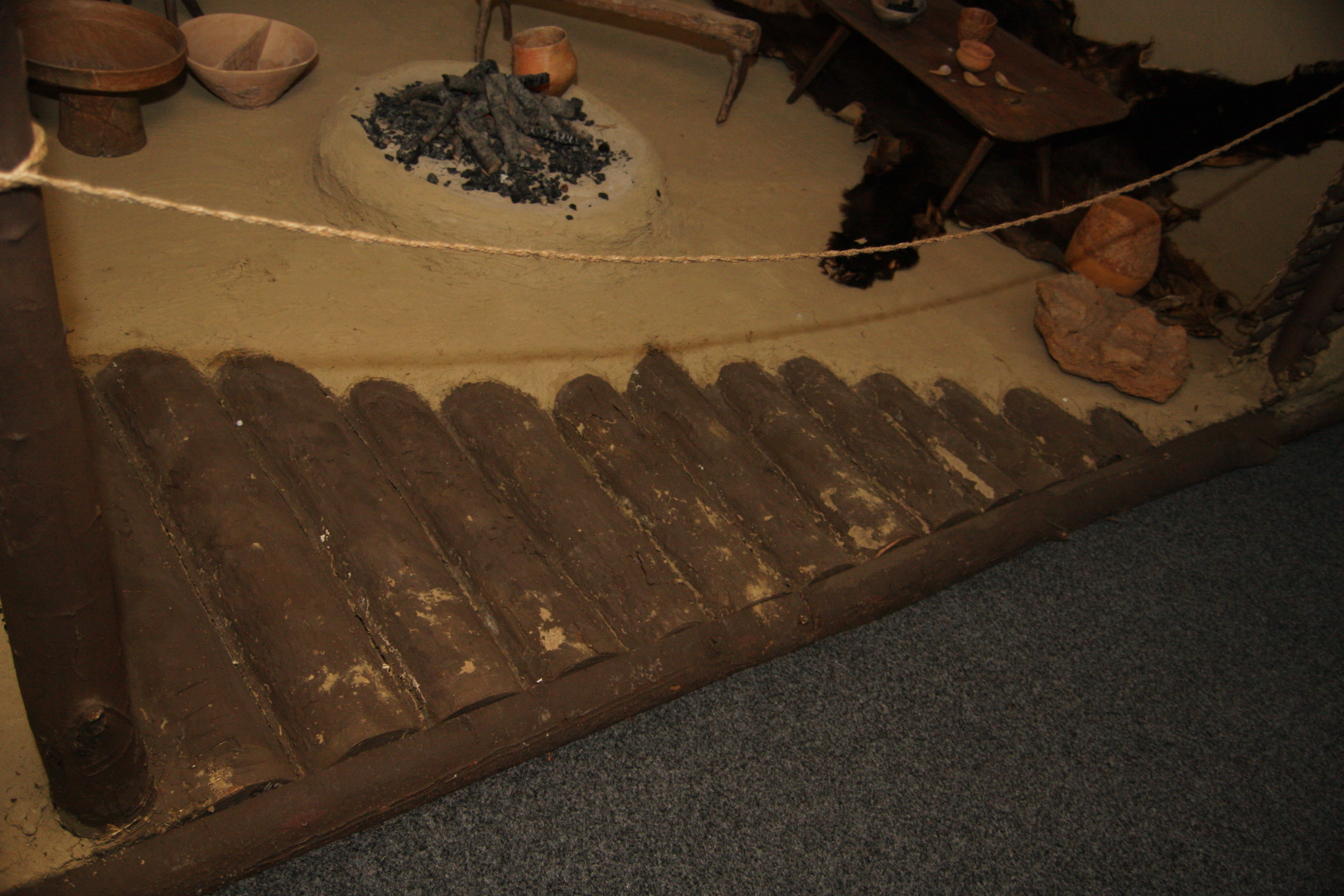
Floor reconstruction showing a log floor covered in clay

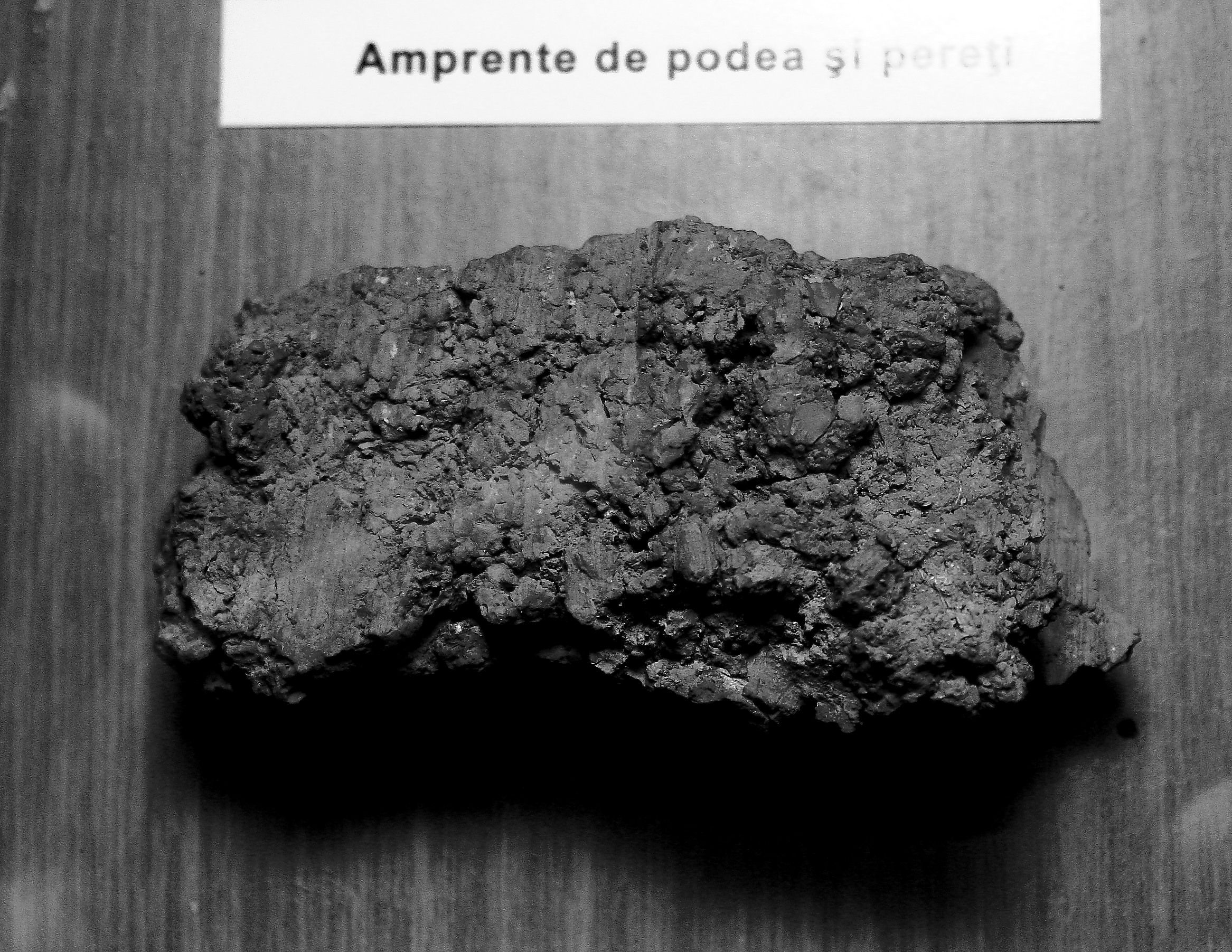
Archaeological Cucuteni–Trypillia building structure imprints in clay

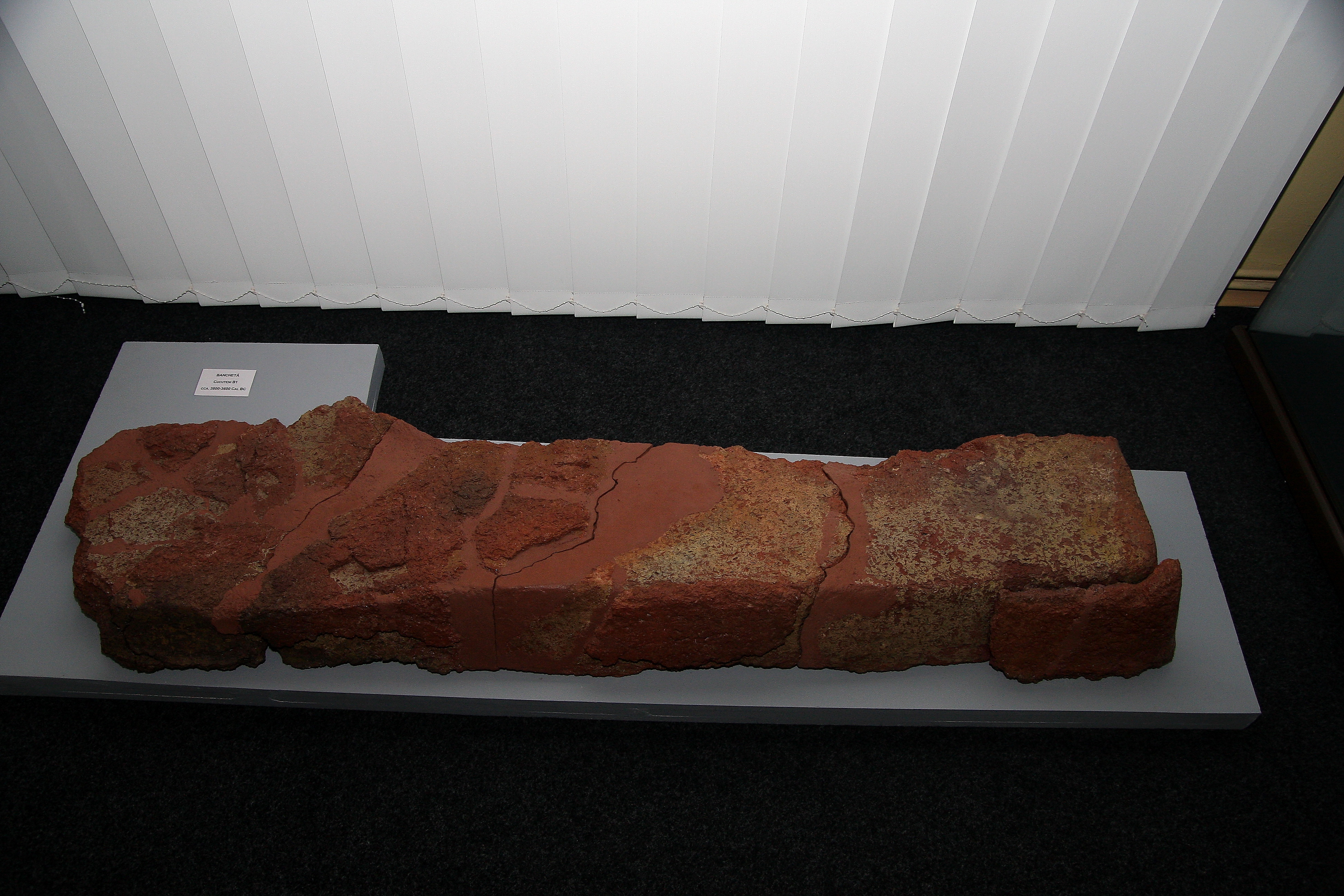
Vitrified clay bench

== Bordei dwellings ==
Some of the houses found by archeologists were dugout earth houses, of the style called bordei in both Romanian (Romanian: bordei) and Ukrainian (Ukrainian: бордей). Unlike surface dwellings characterized by walls with right angles and rectangular shapes the bordei houses were characterized by elliptical shapes. These houses would typically have a wooden floor that was about 1.5 meters (4.9 feet) below ground, which would place the roof at just above ground level. Images of bordei homes may be seen at the Romanian Art Zone page

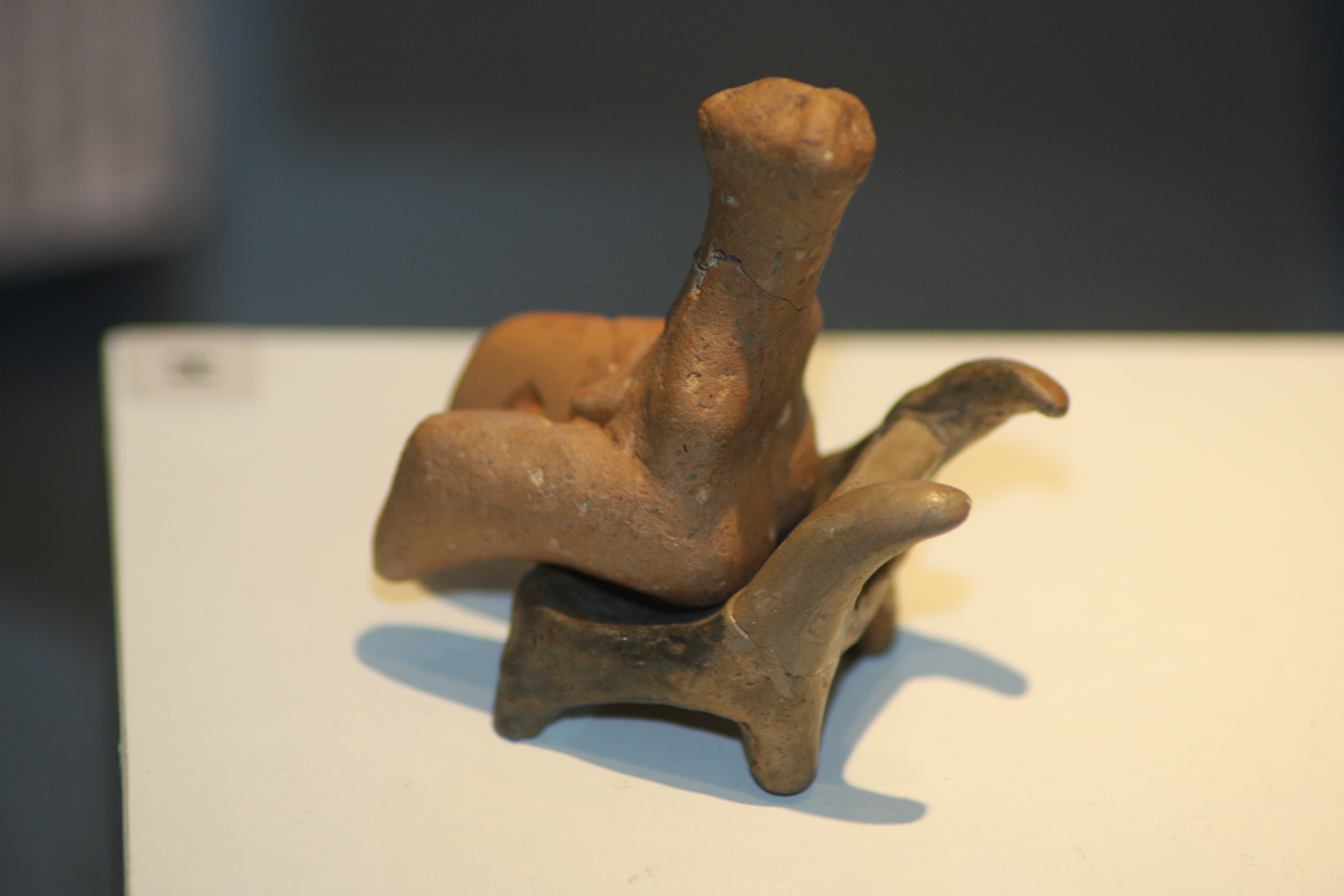
A clay model of a figurine in a chair

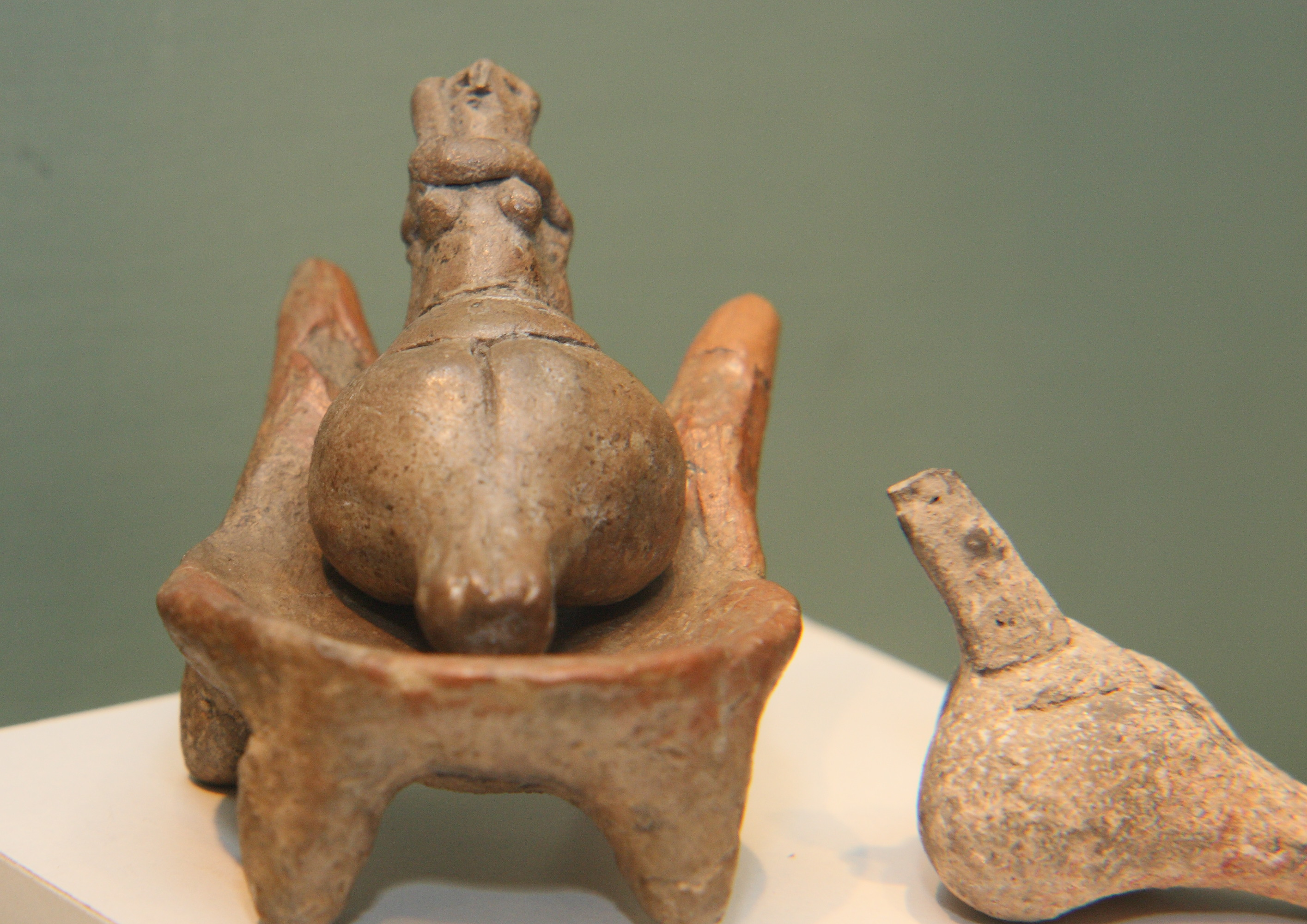
A clay Precucuteni Goddess and chair

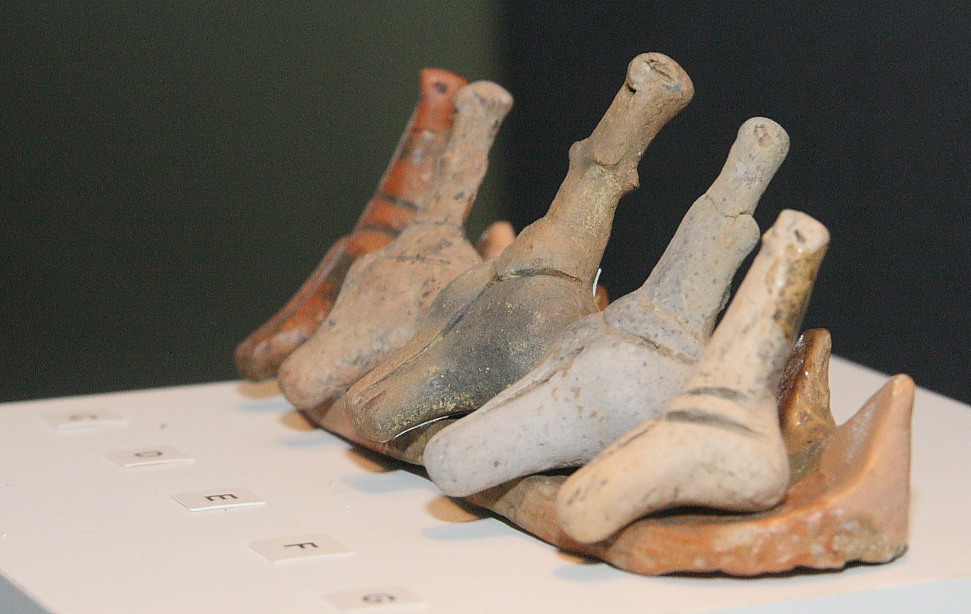
Clay models found at a Cucuteni-Trypillian site showing figurines sitting on a couch-like piece of furniture

== House interior ==
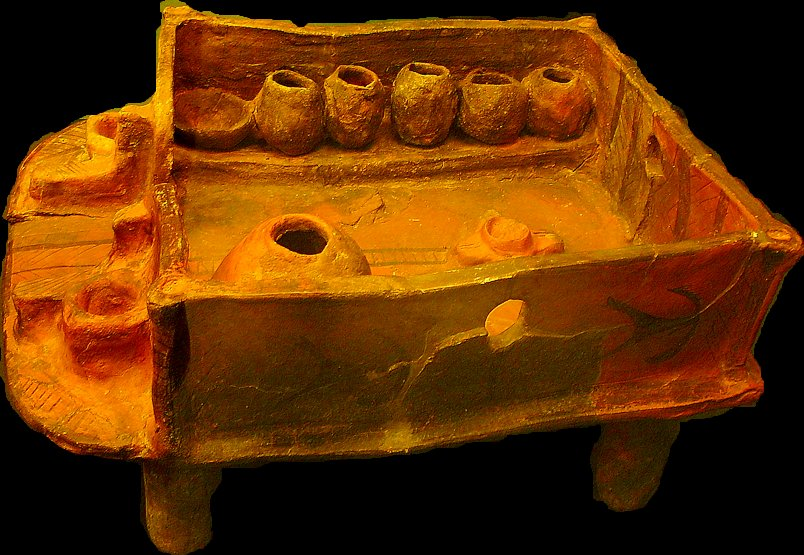
Clay Model of house interior with two fireplaces

Most of the Cucuteni-Trypillia houses were arranged by locating the front door opposite from where the fireplace sat. Large ceramic pottery containers used to store water and grain were placed next to the fireplace. Other ceramic containers, including the more valuable painted pottery, would also be located near the fireplace. Some of the fine painted pottery for which this culture is known would be used for clothing storage but most of it seems to have been used in rituals.

The number of fireplaces found within each house varied from just one (which was the most common) to several, or even none. Each of the fireplaces found in houses that had more than one would have its own specific use such as one for cooking, one for firing ceramics, etc. Most Cucuteni-Trypillia fireplaces were a type of open fire pit and were usually constructed on the floor by laying down a bed of clay mixed with broken pottery shards and then covering this with a smooth clay-plastered surface.

It is assumed that furniture was extensively used however, due to the climate of this region, wood does not preserve well here. However some of the many miniature clay figurines found at Cucuteni-Trypillia sites were placed sitting or reclining on different pieces of furniture, some of which resemble sofas, chairs, or even ovens. There is also some evidence of furniture being incorporated into the structure of the walls of houses by using woven branches covered with clay.
