= Zemlyanka =

Type of earth shelter with ancient origins

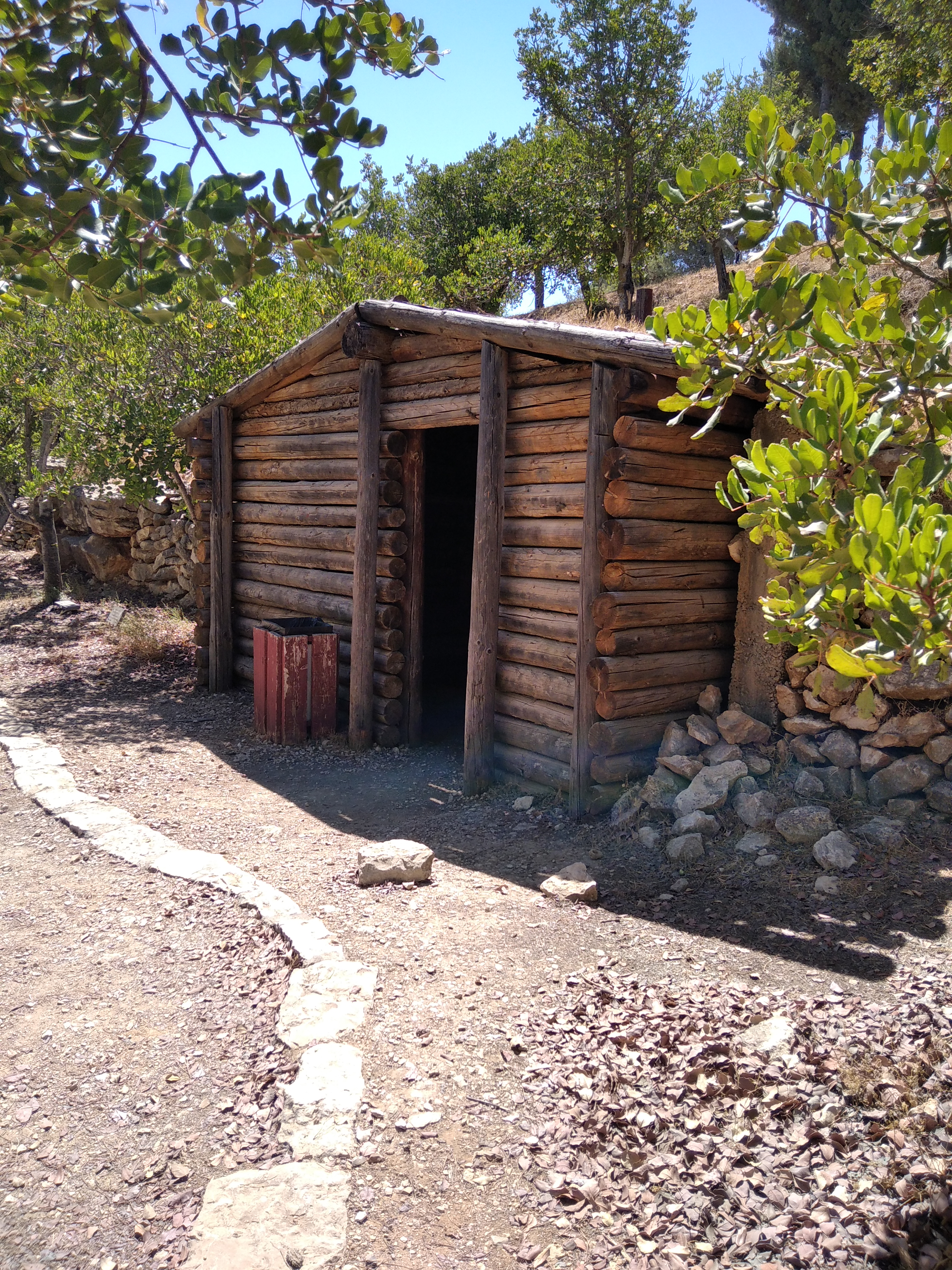
A Zemlyanka model, Yad Vashem, Jerusalem

Zemlyanka (Russian, Ukrainian: землянка, Belarusian: зямлянка. Czech: zemnice, Lithuanian: zemine, Polish: ziemianka, Slovak: zemľanka) is a North Slavic name for a dugout or earth-house which was used to provide shelter for humans or domestic animals as well as for food storage. Based on a hole or depression dug into the ground, these structures are one of the most ancient types of housing known. Zemlyankas can be partially or fully recessed into the earth, with a flat roof covered with branches or sod, or dug into a hillside. The use of natural earth for insulation and protection for underground living has evolved into the "earth shelter" technology used today in architecture.

== World War II ==
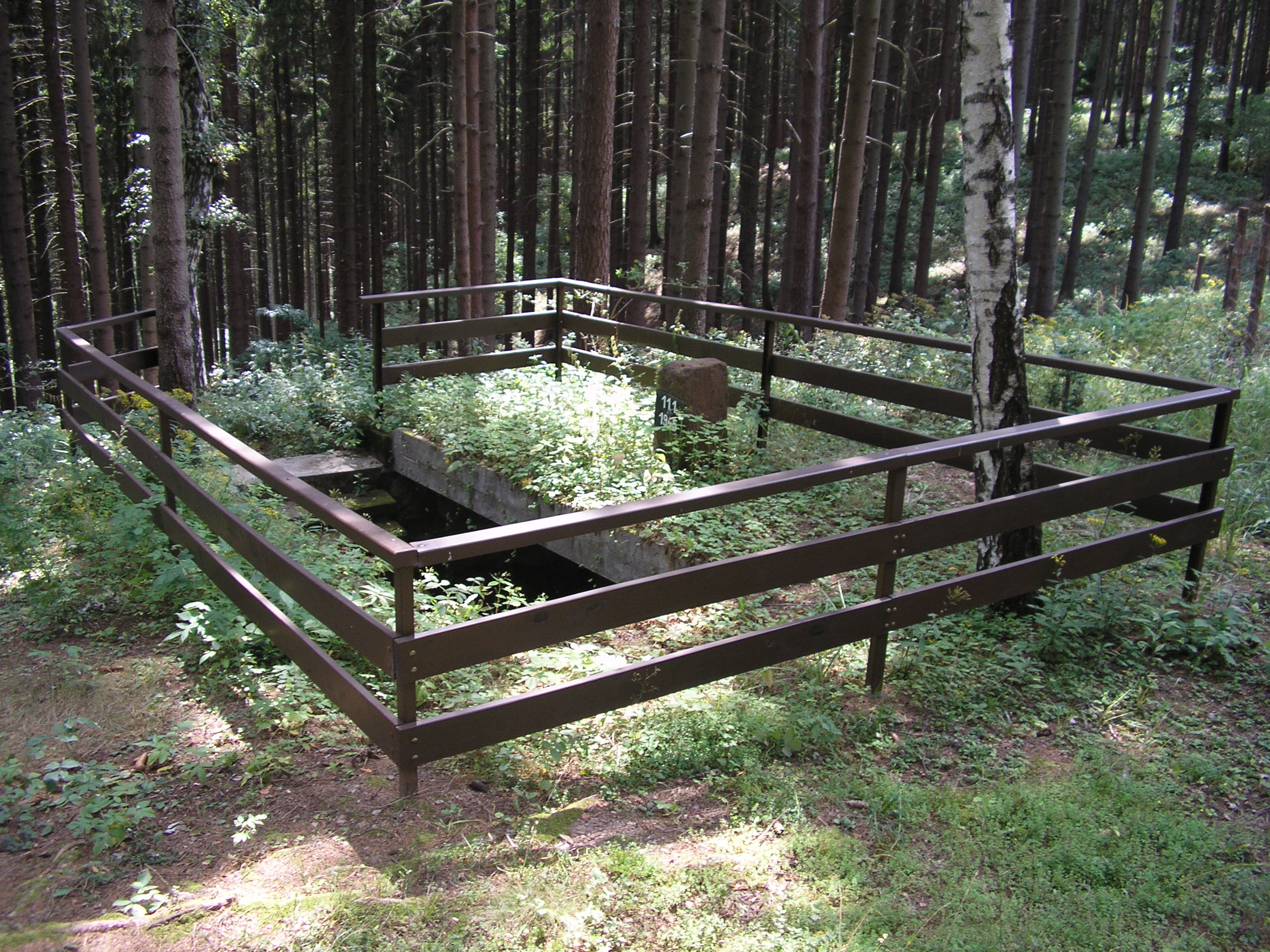
Zemlyanka used by partisans near Nýrov, Czech Republic, preserved as a World War II memorial

In World War II, partisans, or armed resistance fighters in Eastern Europe sometimes lived in zemlyankas which were used as underground bunkers to provide shelter and a hiding place from enemies. Notably they were used by members of the famous "Bielski partisans" in modern-day Belarus, then German-occupied Poland, where they were called ziemianki in plural form.

== In popular culture ==
Zemlyanka was the name of an Eastern Front (World War II) song written by A. Surkov (lyrics) and K. Listov (music) in 1941 during the Battle of Moscow. The use of zemlyankas by soldiers is mentioned in the song. However, due to its pessimism, the song was considered to be unpatriotic by the Soviet government at the time.

== See also ==
- Barabara
- Burdei
- Dugout
- Pit-house, also known by its German name grubenhaus
