= Gnadenau, Kansas =

Ghost town in Marion County, Kansas

- Ghost town
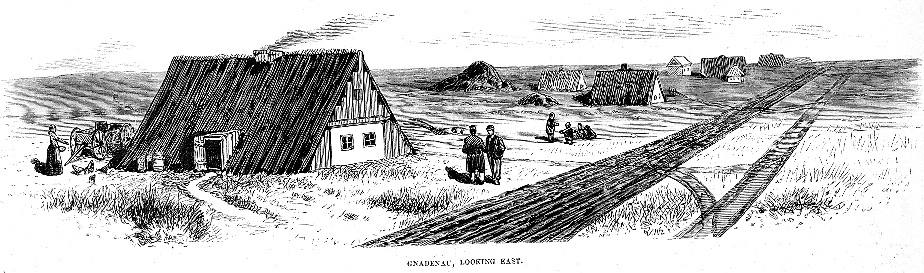
- Burdei-type housing in Gnadenau (Frank Leslie's Illustrated March 20, 1875)

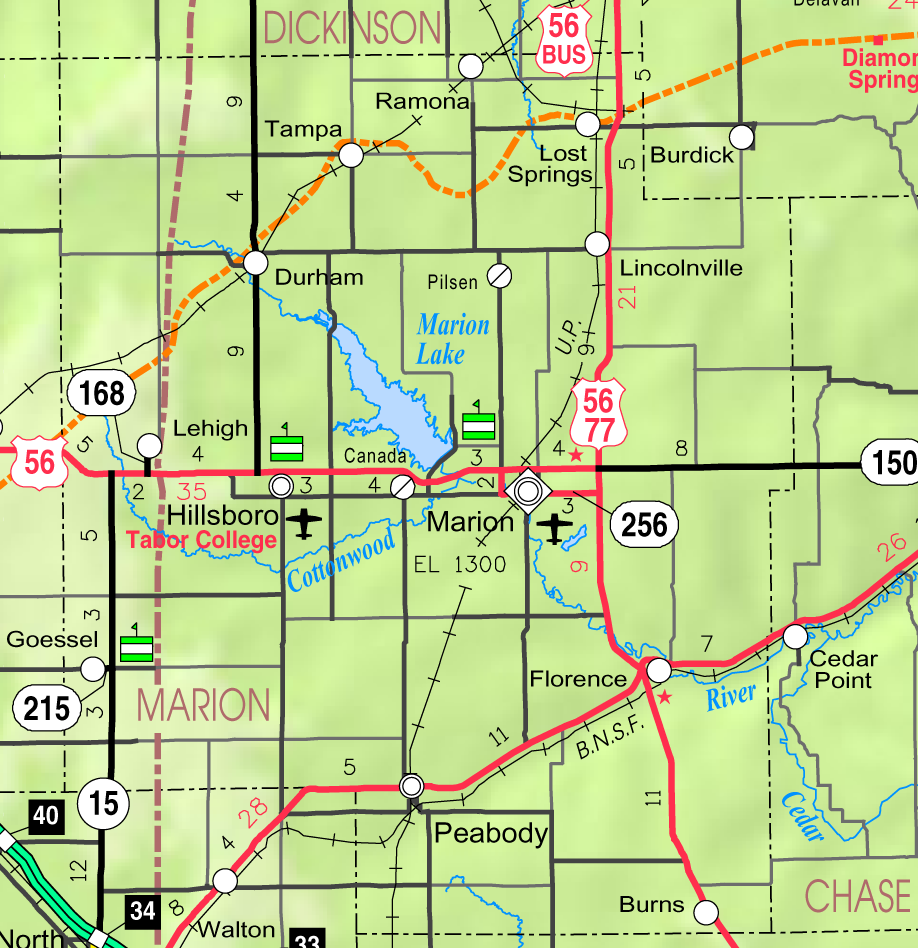
- KDOT map of Marion County (legend)

- Location within Kansas Location within the United States
- Coordinates: 38°19′34.413″N 97°10′49.882″W
- Country: United States
- State: Kansas
- County: Marion
- Township: Liberty
- Founded: 1874
- Elevation: 1,378 ft (420 m)

Population
  - Total: 0
- Time zone: UTC-6 (CST)
  - Summer (DST): UTC-5 (CDT)
- Area code: 620
- GNIS ID: 477356

Gnadenau was a communal village of German-speaking Mennonite immigrants from Russia in Marion County, Kansas, United States. It is currently a ghost town that was located approximately 2 miles (3.2 km) southeast of Hillsboro. No buildings remain at this former community site. The Gnadenau Cemetery still exists.

== History ==
=== Early history ===
For many millennia, the Great Plains of North America were inhabited by nomadic Native Americans. From the 16th century to 18th century, the Kingdom of France claimed ownership of large parts of North America. In 1762, after the French and Indian War, France secretly ceded New France to Spain, per the Treaty of Fontainebleau.

=== 19th century ===
In 1802, Spain returned most of the land to France. In 1803, most of the land for modern day Kansas was acquired by the United States from France as part of the 828,000 square mile Louisiana Purchase for 2.83 cents per acre.

In 1854, the Kansas Territory was organized, then in 1861 Kansas became the 34th U.S. state. In 1855, Marion County was established within the Kansas Territory, which included the land for modern day Gnadenau.

In 1874, the German-speaking Mennonites of the Krimmer Mennonite Brethren of Annefeld near Simferopol, Crimea, Russia decided to relocate in the United States because Russia removed their exemption from military service. In August, the group arrived at the site and named it Gnadenau, meaning Meadow of Grace or Grace Meadow. Unlike the majority of Mennonites, this body adopted trine forward immersion as the mode of baptism.

In 1879, the beginning of the demise of the village occurred when the Marion and McPherson Railway Company built a railway north of village and established the nearby town of Hillsboro.

=== 21st century ===
No buildings presently exist in Gnadenau; it is therefore considered a ghost town. A Gnadenau Village Memorial monument still exists.

== Geography ==
Gnadenau was located at 38°19′34.413″N 97°10′49.882″W (38.326226, -97.180523), along 175th Street between Jade Road and Kanza Road in Marion County. Most residents lived on the north side of 175th Street. A descriptive monument for the Gnadenau Village currently stands on the south side of 175th Street, and the Gnadenau Cemetery is immediately south of it.

== Area attractions ==
- Mennonite Settlement Museums, 501 South Ash Street, Hillsboro, main museum on Memorial Drive (one block west).
  - Jacob Friesen Flouring Wind Mill is a detailed replica of the 1876 mill that stood in Gnadenau.

== See also ==
- Historical Maps of Marion County, Kansas
- U.S. Conference of Mennonite Brethren Churches
- Threshing Stone and Winter Wheat
- Burdei
- Molotschna
