= Underground living =

Living below the ground's surface

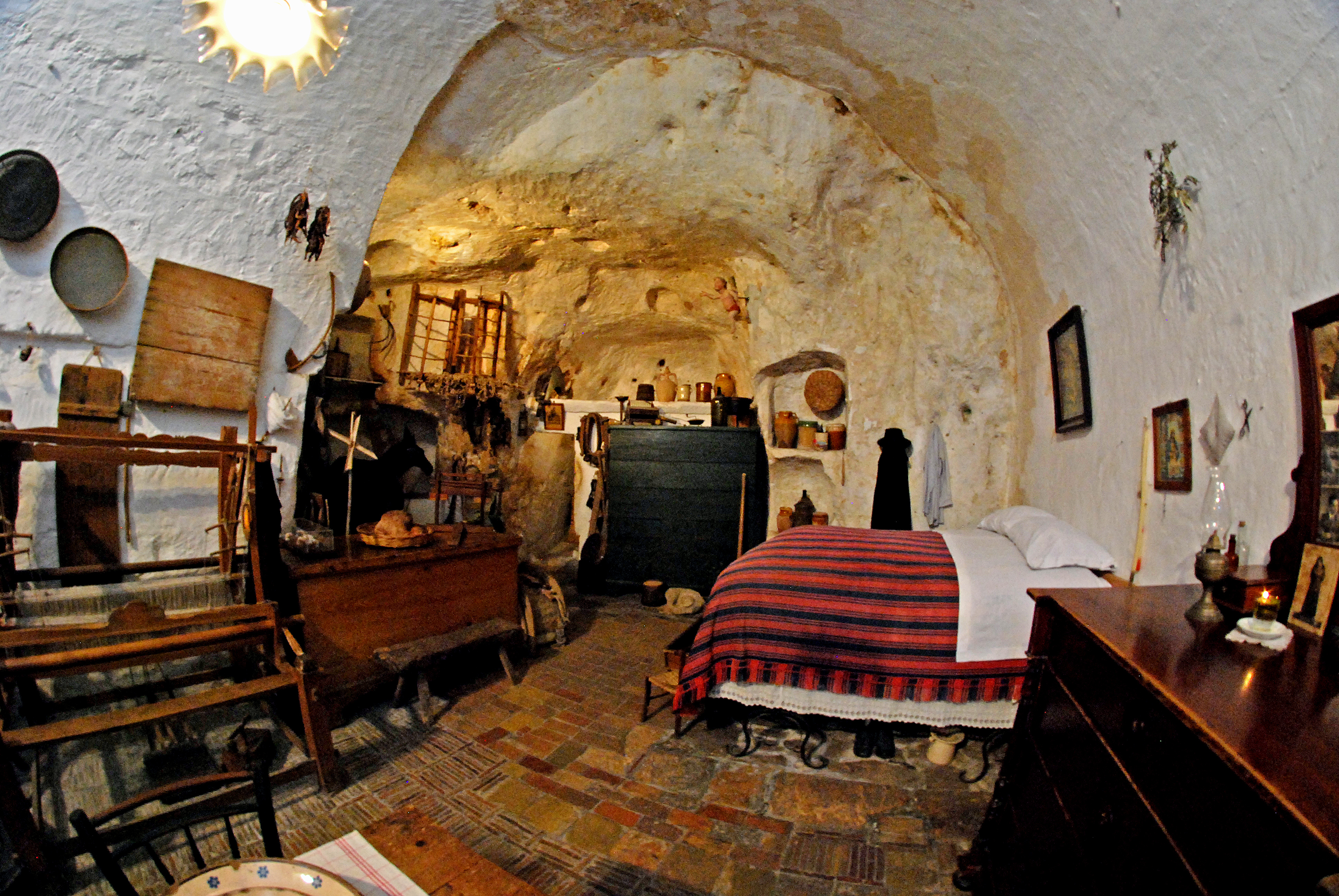
An underground house in the Sassi di Matera, Italy

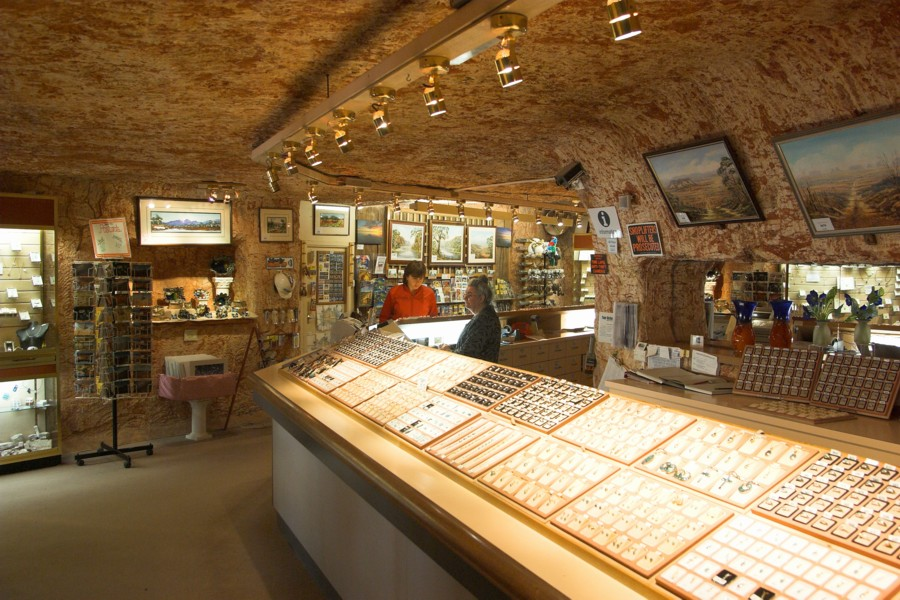
An underground jewellery shop in Coober Pedy, Australia

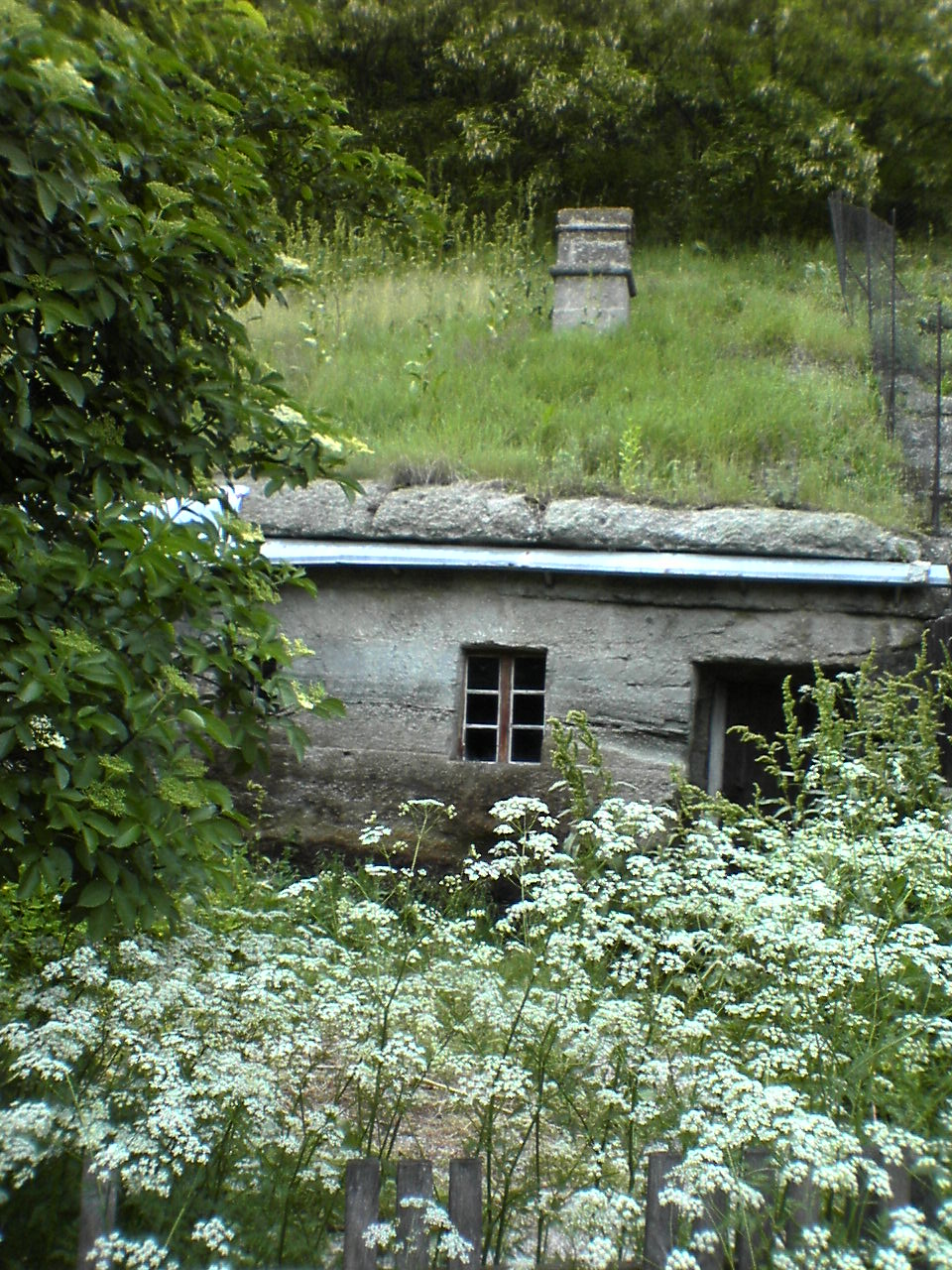
An example of an excavated house in Brhlovce, Slovakia

Underground living refers to living below the ground's surface, whether in natural or manmade caves or structures (earth shelters). Underground dwellings are an alternative to above-ground dwellings for some home seekers, including those who are looking to minimize impact on the environment. Factories and office buildings can benefit from underground facilities for many of the same reasons as underground dwellings such as noise abatement, energy use, and security.

Some advantages of underground houses include resistance to severe weather, quiet living space, an unobtrusive presence in the surrounding landscape, and a nearly constant interior temperature due to the natural insulating properties of the surrounding earth. One appeal is the energy efficiency and environmental friendliness of underground dwellings. However, underground living does have certain disadvantages, such as the potential for flooding, which in some cases may require special pumping systems to be installed.

It is the preferred mode of housing to communities in such extreme environments as Italy's Sassi di Matera, Australia's Coober Pedy, Berber caves as those in Matmata, Tunisia, and even Amundsen–Scott South Pole Station.

Often, underground living structures are not entirely underground; typically, they can be exposed on one side when built into a hill. This exposure can significantly improve interior lighting, although at the expense of greater exposure to the elements.

== History ==
There is only written documentation of Scythian and German subterranean dwellings. Remnants have been found in Switzerland, Mecklenburg and southern Bavaria, "They had a round shape with a kettle-like widening at the bottom, from eleven to fifteen metres in diameter, and from two to four metres in depth".

In the final stage of World War II, the Nazis relocated entire armaments factories underground, as the Allies' air supremacy made surface structures vulnerable to daylight strategic bombing raids.

== Construction methods ==
In parts of rural Australia, subterranean houses are built in a manner similar to prairie dog holes. There is a "chimney" placed higher than ground-level and a lower, ground-level, entrance. This orientation causes a continuous breeze throughout the house, reducing or eliminating the need for air conditioning.

== Sustainable Development of Urban Underground Space (UUS) ==
As a step towards achieving the United Nations' SDGs (in particular Goal 11: Make cities and human settlements inclusive, safe, resilient and sustainable), urban cities in developed economies of the world are increasingly looking "downwards" rather than expanding limited land resources at the surface. Helsinki, Singapore, Hong Kong, Minneapolis, Tokyo, Shanghai, Montreal etc. are some of the benchmark cities in this regard. Underground space as a valuable land resource can be integrated into a general urban resources management scheme and development policy, by rationalizing resource supply according to economic demand, and by coordinating stakeholders from the public administration, private administration, private developers and users. The consideration of the other dimension (underground) in city planning holds a promising future for sustainable underground living, where it can contribute to making cities more liveable, resilient and inclusive. Historically planning of subsurface facilities has been subject to an ad-hoc development approach by separate sectors and disciplines. Successful integration of Urban Underground Space into city planning however requires a synergy of several disciplines and stakeholders to achieve rational use of space resources.

== Structures ==
There are various ways to develop structures for underground living.

- Natural caves have been used for millennia as shelter.
- Constructed caves, or dugouts are a common structure for underground living. Although the tunnelling techniques required to make them have been well developed by the mining industry, they can be considerably more costly and dangerous to make than some of the alternatives. On the plus side, they can be quite deep. Some examples would be the Sassi di Matera in Italy, declared by UNESCO a World Heritage Site, and the town of Coober Pedy in Australia, built underground to avoid the blistering heat of the outback. One of the traditional house types in China is the Yaodong, a cave house. Also, see the Nok and Mamproug Cave Dwellings in Togo, Africa.
- Earth berm structures are essentially traditional homes that have then been buried, typically leaving at least one wall exposed for lighting and ventilation. However, because they are to be buried, the structures must be made of materials capable of surviving the increased weight and moisture of being underground.
- Rammed earth structures are not truly underground, in the sense of being below grade or buried beneath a berm. Instead, they are structures made of tightly packed earth, similar to concrete but without the binding properties of cement. These structures share many properties with traditional adobe construction.
- Culvert structures are a very simple approach. Large precast concrete pipes and boxes a few metres across are assembled into the desired arrangement of rooms and hallways onsite, either atop the existing ground or below grade in excavated trenches, then buried. This approach can also be referred to as Cut and Cover.
- Urban underground living is so common that few even think of it as underground. Many shopping malls are partially or totally underground, in the sense that they are below grade. Though not as exotic as the other underground structures, those working in such urban underground structures are in fact living underground.
- Shaft structures. For example, Taisei Corporation proposed to build Alice City in Tokyo Japan. The project would incorporate a very wide and deep shaft, within which would be built levels for habitation, all looking in toward a hollow core topped with a huge skylight.
- Tunnels, including storm drains, are used by homeless people as shelter in large cities.

== In fiction ==
Underground living has been a feature of fiction, such as the hobbit holes of the Shire as described in the stories of J. R. R. Tolkien and The Underground City by Jules Verne. Some films are almost entirely set underground, such as THX 1138. The Fallout series also has underground shelters called Vaults.

The majority of the early short science-fiction story "The Machine Stops" by British author E.M. Forster is set in an imagined underground city.

== See also ==
Parent categories:

- Rock-cut architecture – Structures and sculptures cut into solid rock
- Subterranea (geography) – Underground space, natural and man-made underground structures: underground structures
- Underground city – Series of linked subterranean spaces, umbrella article for underground dwellings and facilities
- Underground construction – Field of engineering for the design and construction of structures below the ground

Types of underground living spaces and people, and related topics:

- Basement – Floor of a building which is below grade
- Bunker – Defensive military storage fortification
- Dugout (shelter) – Hole or depression used as shelter
- Earth house – House partially or entirely surrounded by earth
- Earth sheltering – House partially or entirely surrounded by earth
- Fallout shelter – Space protecting occupants from radioactive debris
- Green building – Environmentally responsible construction principles
- Icelandic turf house – House type
- Kiva – Room used by Puebloans for religious rituals and political meetings
- Mole people – People who live in tunnels underground
- Pit-house – Type of earth shelter with ancient origins
- Souterrain – Underground structure associated mainly with the Atlantic Iron Age
- Underground base
- Underwater habitat – Human habitable underwater enclosure filled with breathable gas
- Walipini – Earth-sheltered structure for growing plants
- Trench – Excavated channel in ground
- Quiggly hole – Remains of an earth lodge built by First Nations people
- Zemlyanka – Type of earth shelter with ancient origins
