= Dugout (shelter) =

Hole or depression used as shelter

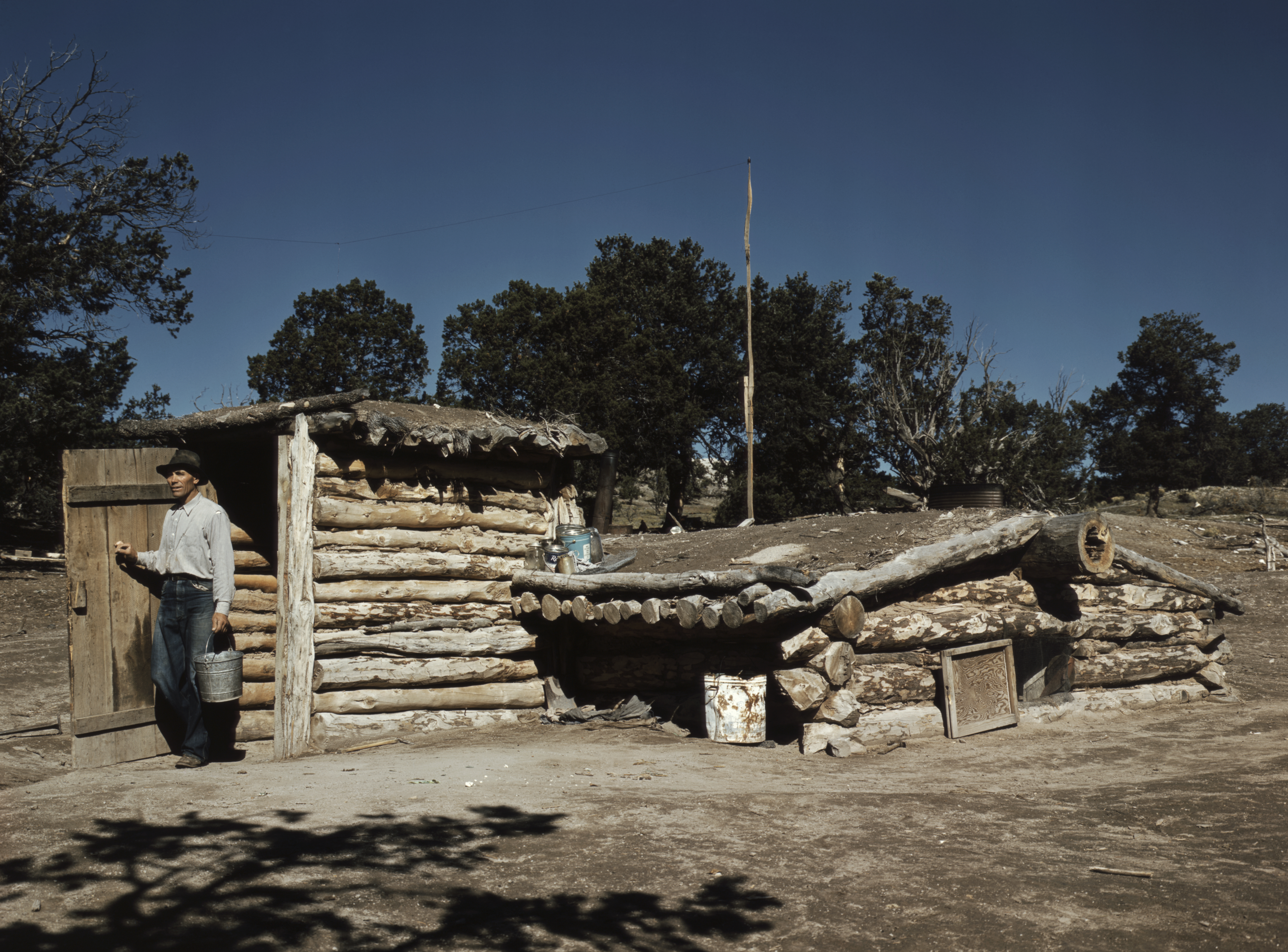
Dugout home near Pie Town, New Mexico, 1940

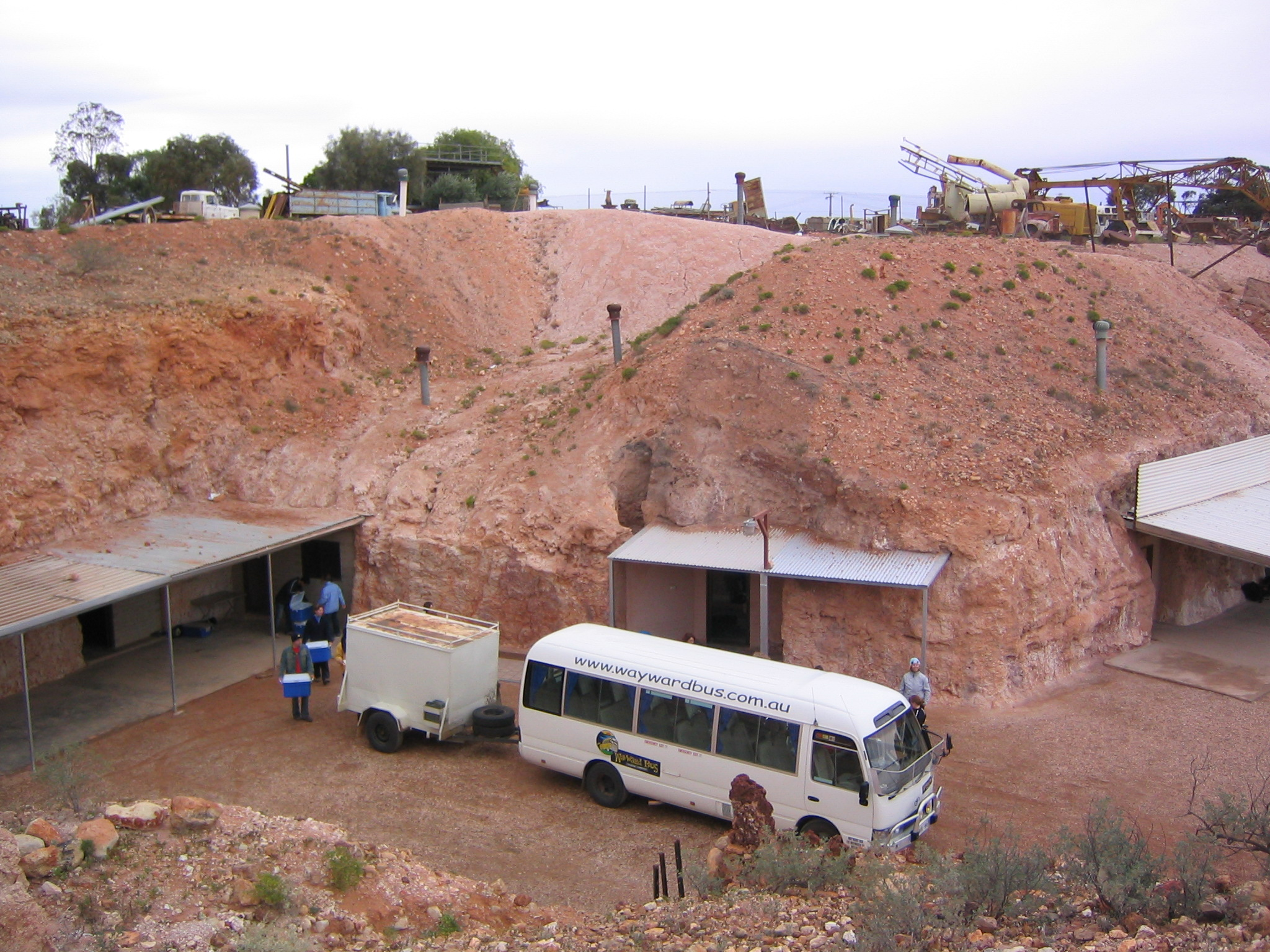
Coober Pedy dugout, Australia

A dugout or dug-out, also known as a pit-house or earth lodge, is a shelter for humans or domesticated animals and livestock based on a hole or depression dug into the ground. Dugouts can be fully recessed into the earth, with a flat roof covered by ground, or dug into a hillside. They can also be semi-recessed, with a constructed wood or sod roof standing out. These structures are one of the most ancient types of human housing known to archaeologists, and the same methods have evolved into modern "earth shelter" technology.

Dugouts may also be temporary shelters constructed as an aid to specific activities, e.g., concealment and protection during warfare or shelter while hunting.

== Africa ==
=== Tunisia ===
First driven underground by enemies who invaded their country, the Berbers of Matmata found underground homes the best defense against summer heat.

== Asia and the Pacific ==
=== Australia ===
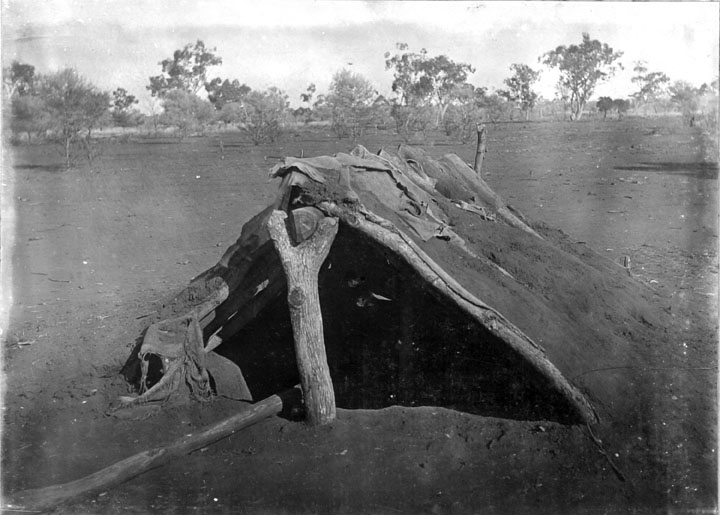
An Indigenous Australian dugout near Cunnamulla, Queensland around 1910

Burra in South Australia's Mid-North region was the site of the famous 'Monster Mine' (copper) and home to 4,400 people in 1851, 1,800 of whom were living in dugouts in the Burra Creek. Census data from 1851 shows that nearly 80 percent of the workers living in the dugouts were miners, with probably the majority being Cornish. Floods and the Victorian gold rush effectively ended the large scale use of dugouts in Burra, but people were still being 'washed' out of the creek in 1859.

Coober Pedy is a small outback town in northern South Australia, 846 kilometres north of Adelaide on the Stuart Highway, where opal mining is the dominant industry. Most residents live in caves excavated into the hillsides to avoid the harsh summer temperatures and work underground in mine shafts. White Cliffs, New South Wales is similar, in terms of climate, housing, and mining operations.

=== China ===
In north China, especially on the Loess Plateau, caves called yaodongs dug into hillsides have been the traditional dwellings from early times. The advantage of a yaodong over an ordinary house is that it needs little heating in winter and no cooling in summer. An estimated 40 million people in northern China live in a yaodong. Many people live in semi-recessed dugout houses in north-western China where hot summers and cold winters prevail.

=== Japan ===
Yoshinogari site

In the Early Jōmon period of Japanese prehistory (10,000 to 300 BC) complex pit houses were the most commonly used method of housing.

== Middle East ==
=== Israel ===
During the Bar Kokhba Revolt, Jews used an intricate system of man-made hideout complexes, prepared well in advance of the onset of the revolt. Many such sites were discovered in Judaea and the Galilee, for instance at Horvat 'Ethri.

=== Turkey (Cappadocia) ===
Cappadocia contains at least 36 historical underground cities, carved out of unusual geological formations formed via the eruptions of ancient volcanoes. The cities were initially inhabited by the Hittites, then later by early Christians as hiding places. They are now archeological and tourist sites, but are not generally occupied (see Kaymaklı Underground City). The latest large Turkish underground city was discovered in 2007 in Gaziemir, Güzelyurt. This city was a stopover on the Silk Road, allowing travelers and their camels to rest in safety, underground, in a 'fortress' hotel equivalent to a modern hotel.

== Europe ==
=== Crimea ===
The well-preserved cave towns of Crimea are Mangup-Kale, Eski-Kermen, Inkerman and Chufut-Kale. The settlement of Mangup-Kale dates back to the 3rd century AD and was fortified by Justinian I in the mid 6th century. It was inhabited and governed primarily by Crimean Goths, and became the center of their autonomous principality. The last inhabitants, a small community of Karaims, abandoned the site in the 1790s.

=== Iceland ===
In Iceland, since time immemorial and well into the 20th century, most houses were partly dug down, with turf or sod walls built up and roofs made of timber and turf/sod. Turf was used because timber was scarce and expensive, and stone not practical before the advent of concrete.

=== Italy ===
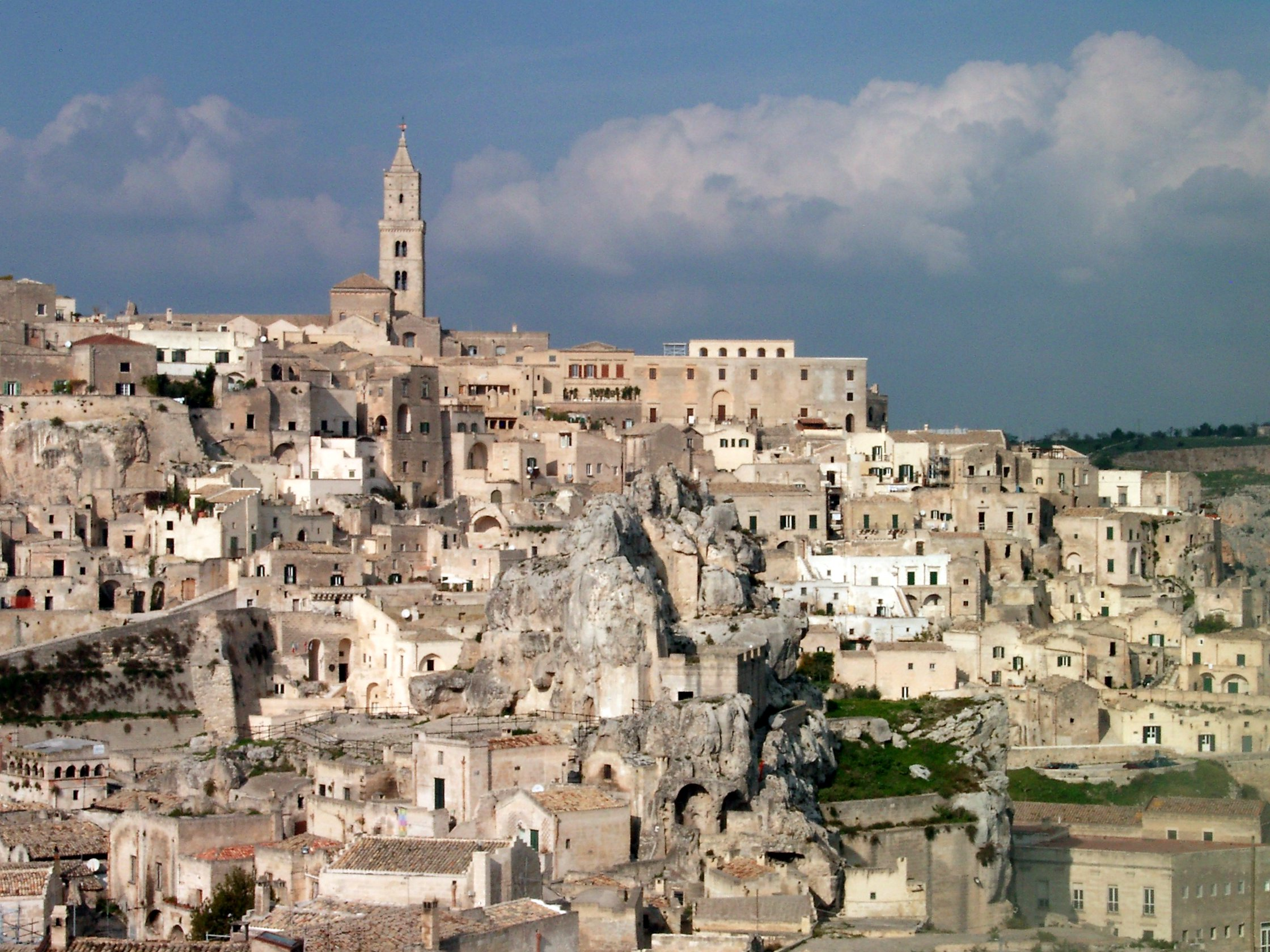
The "Sassi di Matera"

Matera has gained international fame for its ancient town, the "Sassi di Matera" (meaning "stones of Matera"), which is UNESCO World Heritage Site since 1993. The Sassi are houses dug into the volcanic rock itself, known locally as "Tufo", which is characteristic of Basilicata and Apulia.

=== Netherlands ===
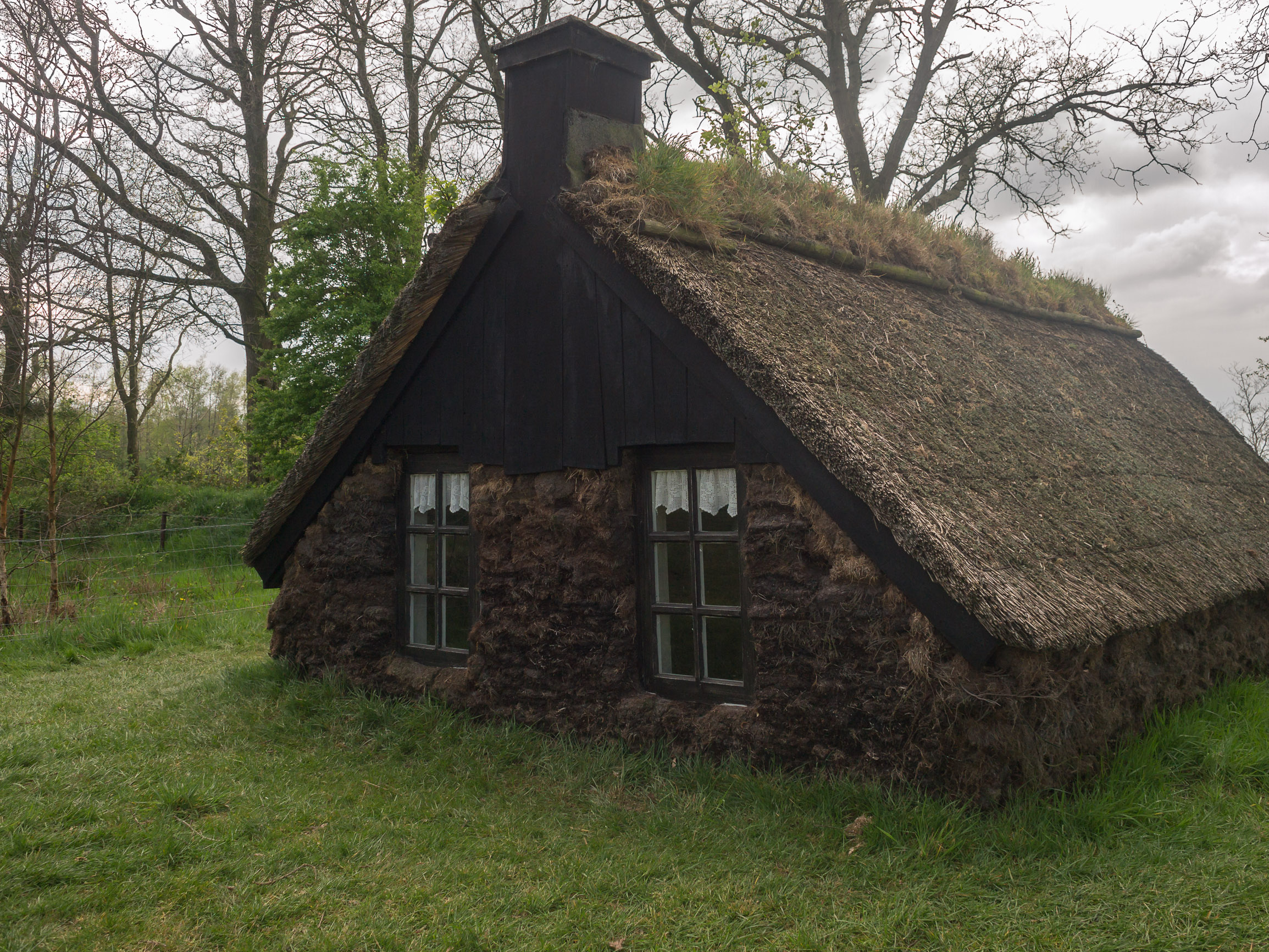
A "plaggenhut" in the Netherlands in Themepark de Spitkeet, Harkema

In the Netherlands the dugout (Dutch: plaggenhut) was banned by the housing safety law of 1901. In some areas in the east of the country, people lived in dugouts into the 1960s. Dutch dugouts are constructed around an excavated pit with a roof made from heather sod, and front and back walls made from slabs of peat. A small number of these huts survive, and can be seen in the open air museums of Arnhem, Schoonoord, Barger-Compascuum and Harkema. Modernized dugouts are available as tourist accommodation in several locations.

=== Poland (Mazovia) ===
Dugouts called ziemianka were used as stores for food in Mazovia (Poland).

=== Romania ===
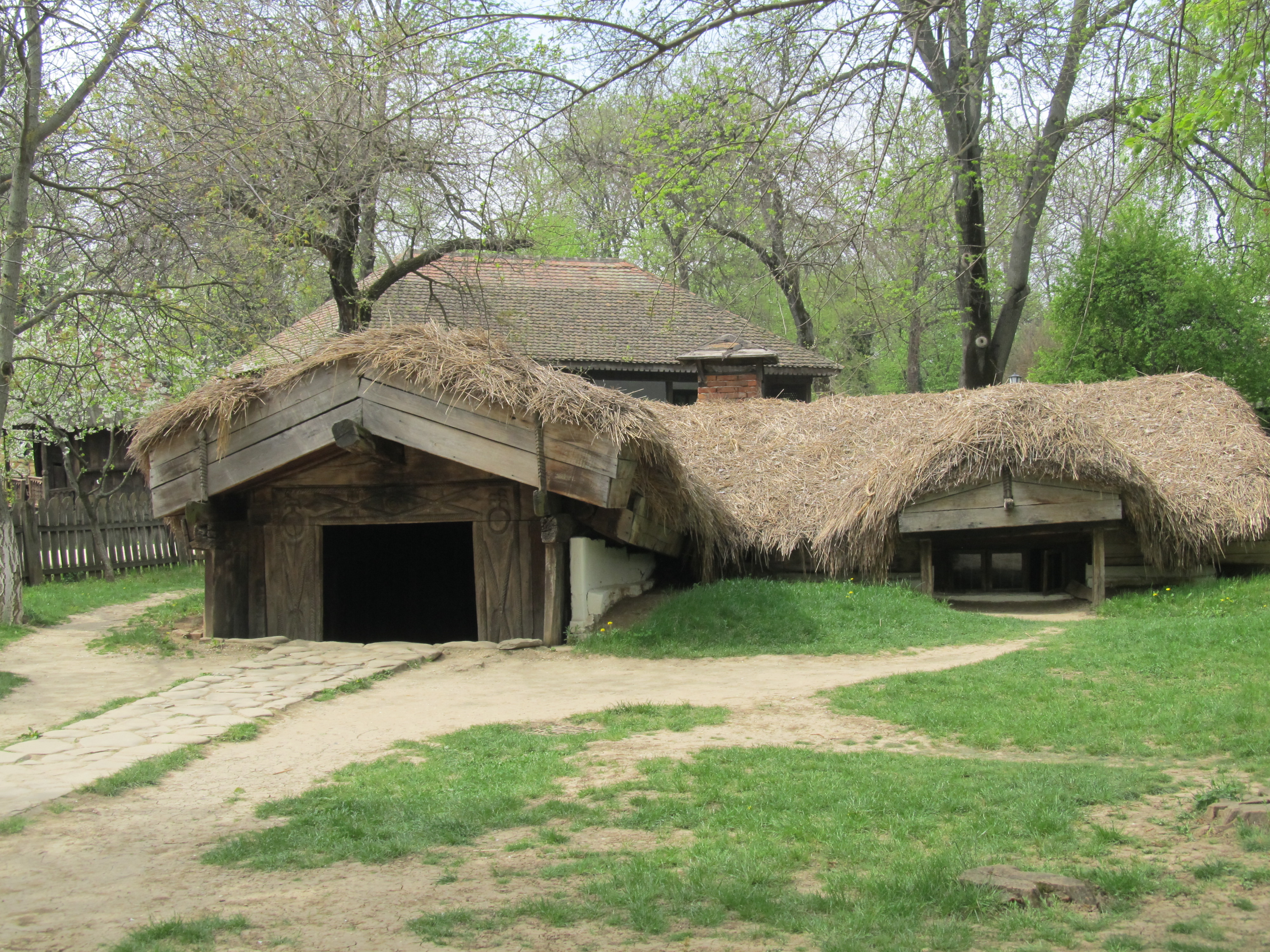
Half-buried house from Drăghiceni, Olt County, Romania, dated 19th century. Exhibited at the Village Museum Bucharest.

Dugouts called Bordei were widely used on the territory of Romania since the Neolithic until mid-20th century. They were wide-spread in the plains, such as on the Romanian Plain, where dwellers could use cheap construction materials such as pit, wood and straw, but more durable materials such as stone were rare and expensive. Similar dug-outs were used in the neighbouring regions of the wider Eurasian Steppe, e.g. in Ukraine, where they were known as Burdei.

=== Scotland ===
In ancient Scotland, earth houses, also known as yird, Weems and Picts' houses, were underground dwellings, extant even after the Roman evacuation of Britain. Entry was effected by a passage not much wider than a fox burrow, which sloped downwards 10 or 12 ft. to the floor of the house; the inside was oval in shape, and was walled with overlapping rough stone slabs; the roof frequently reached to within a foot of the Earth's surface; they probably served as storehouses, winter quarters, and as places of refuge in times of war. Similar dwellings are found in Ireland.

=== Serbia ===
In Serbia they are called zemunica. Also, the town of Zemun derived its name from Zemln, which is akin to zemunica.

=== Spain ===
The most famous feature of the town of Guadix is the cave dwellings in the Barrio.

== North America ==
Many of the ancient peoples of the American continents built semi-permanent houses of poles and brush plastered with mud over a shallow pit in the earth. As these pithouses were very similar to those first built in northeastern Europe 25,000 years ago, pithouse technology may have been carried to the Americas by early nomadic settlers, traveling first through Siberia, and then across the ice bridge between Asia and North America about 12,000 to 14,000 years ago.

An individual pithouse was occupied for an average of about 15 years. By more modern standards, these dwellings were cramped and dark. The centralized hearth created a smoky, cold environment during the winter. Most pithouses are associated with an open air plaza or rooftop where inhabitants carried out most of their daily activities during good weather. In areas suitable for intensive agriculture, groups of pithouses clustered to create communities of varying sizes.

=== British Columbia and American Northwest ===
In the Interior Plateau of the British Columbia and in the Columbia Plateau of the Pacific Northwest the remains of a form of pit-house called a quiggly hole or kekuli are common, and come in large groups named quiggly towns, which are correspondingly the remains of ancient villages.

=== Canadian Prairies ===
The Doukhobor Dugout House in Blaine Lake, Saskatchewan was designated a National Historic Site of Canada in 2008. Although today it is the only known partially surviving example of this type of shelter, it was one of many such dugout houses constructed by Doukhobors upon arrival in Canada, and a form of shelter used by many settlers of various ethnicities upon their arrival on the prairies.

=== American Southwest ===
Pithouses were very common structures in the American Southwest during the early and middle periods of the Anasazi, Mogollon and Hohokam cultures, and were also found in cultures extending north and west of the Colorado plateau. The emergence of the pithouse marks the transition between a nomadic hunting-and-gathering livelihood and a settled agricultural way of life which also relied on wild plants and animals for food. Pithouse structures were probably the forerunners of the kivas built later in the Pueblo periods, and share many characteristics with them.

Although the architectural styles used by these people evolved throughout their history, the pithouse remained a basic residential structure. Pithouses are found in isolated rural settings, in conjunction with above ground dwellings and adjacent to the large multi-room cliff dwellings characteristic of the region. Historian Linda Cordell notes that ...the late pithouses are often clues to relatively short-term changes in settlement location and adjustment to climatic fluctuations. (Cordell, p. 164) This appears to be true among the modern Pueblo peoples as well. When the Hopi village of Bacavi was founded in 1909, some groups of people arrived in the late autumn. As there was a limited window of time for building, the new arrivals built pithouses as warm shelters for the winter. Some of these homes remained occupied until the 1970s.

Pithouses were built by excavating a well defined hole into the ground, usually around 6" to 18" deep but occasionally as deep as four to five feet, and creating walls and roof using a pole and adobe technology. The sunken floor of the dwelling is below the frost line and helps moderate both winter and summer temperatures, with the mass of the ground serving as an insulator. In addition, adobe walls gather heat during the day and release it when temperatures drop. The earliest pithouses were round, and varied in size between nine and twenty-five feet in diameter. Around 700, pithouse designs became more individualized. Excavations reveal examples based on squares, rectangles and shapes similar to the letter D.

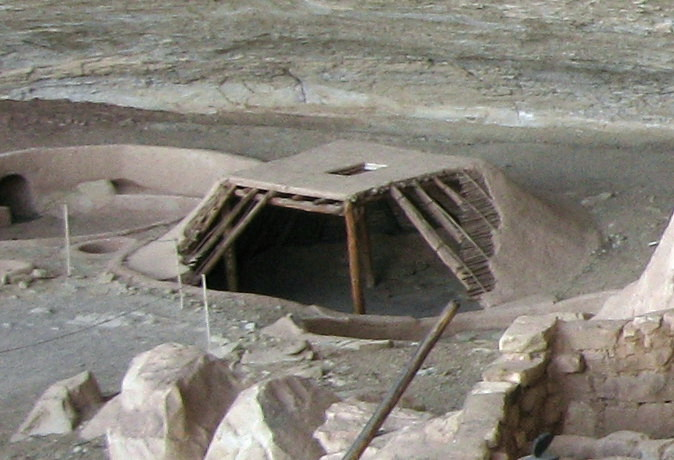
A reconstruction shows the pit dug below ground, four supporting posts, roof structure as a layers of wood and mud, and entry through the roof; Step House ruins at Mesa Verde National Park.

These homes were also warmed by a centralized hearth, a fire pit with an air deflector, and side vents and a smoke hole in the roof provided fresh air and evacuated smoke. The placement of the home's entrance varied by locality and archaeological period. Early homes utilized the ventilation stack as an egress by means of a ladder. Later homes expanded the pit into a keyhole shape to create a low sheltered entrance. Interior space was often loosely divided into two rooms, one for storing personal and dry goods and the other as living quarters. Many pithouses included an antechamber, containing storage bins or pits.

Pithouse construction was usually based on four corner posts positioned upright in the pit. These posts were carefully chosen and trimmed to create a branch or fork at the top as a structural support. They were joined by horizontal beams and crossed with ceiling joists. The interior sides of the pit were plastered with clay or lined with stone — either large slabs wedged upright in the soil or courses of smaller stones. The exterior of the pithouse was formed of branches, packed tree bark, or brush and grass. A thick layer of mud on the outside of the roof and walls protected the shelter from the weather. Often the initial mud layer was carefully plastered with a lighter colored clay.

A large number of pithouses have been archaeologically excavated throughout the American Southwest. Reproductions of these basic family structures exist in museums and tourist information sites, such as the structure at the Manitou Cliff Dwellings. National and state parks and monuments showcase pithouse ruins and may include authentic reconstructions such as the Ancient Pueblo structure at Step House ruin, Mesa Verde National Park, Fremont Indian State Park and Museum in Utah, and a Hohokam structure at the Hardy Site in Tucson, Arizona.

=== Sod houses ===
During the American Civil War, the federal United States government passed the Homestead Act offering free land for those who could "prove up" their claims by living on the land and farming it for a prescribed number of years. Settlers on the newly opened Great Plains found there were not enough trees to build familiar log cabins. As shelter was essential, the settlers utilized ribbons of the thick prairie sod cut from the land. The strip could be cut into two foot sections, four to six inches deep, to make an almost perfect building block with good insulating properties.

These first homes, often called soddies, were small rooms dug into the side of a low rolling hill. The walls were built up with sod blocks to a height of seven or eight feet. Holes were left for purchased doors and windows hauled from the nearest town or railhead. Cottonwood poles were laid side by side to form a support for a roof made of a thick layer of coarse prairie grass. Over this was carefully fitted a double layer of the sod building blocks. Rain helped the sod to grow and soon the dugout roof was covered with waving grass. Some frontier families found that their cows grazed on their roof, and occasionally had them fall through.

The floor of the dugout home was of dirt or rough wooden planks. Walls were lined with newspapers pasted or pinned up with small, sharpened sticks to keep dirt from flaking into the home's interior. Some families used fabric on their walls while others created a plaster coating from local limestone and sand. Some were carpeted and other variations included building on a second room for school teachers or guests. Heating could be provided by burning buffalo chips or cow chips. The home's comfort and structural stability were maximized when the structure was located on the south side of a low hill, with adequate drainage to provide run-off for rain and melting snow. Most pioneer dugouts had a short lifespan, being replaced by plank or rock homes when farmers had time and money to create larger, more traditional homes. When a family built a house of logs or boards, their domestic animals often continued to be sheltered in a sod dugout.

=== Burdeis ===
In frontier Canada and the United States, dugout style shelters were also used by pioneers and settlers from Europe. In these cases, the shelter's construction closely reflected the architecture of the various settlers' origins. They ranged from the French-Canadian–style sod houses called caveaux to the burdeis built by Ukrainian immigrants. The burdei was intended as a temporary refuge until a "proper" home of poplar logs and mud/straw plaster could be built. Mennonites from Imperial Russia also built burdeis as temporary shelters when they settled in the Hillsboro region of Kansas.

== Wartime dugouts ==
=== World War I ===
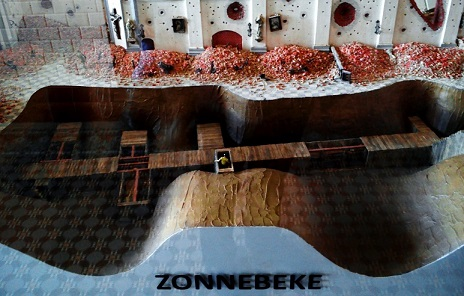
Zonnebeke church dugout constructed by 171st Tunnelling Company in 1918 (model)

Dugouts were used extensively as protection from shelling during World War I in the Western Front. They were an important part of the trench warfare as they were used as an area to rest and carry out other activities such as eating. They would usually range in size from dugouts that could hold several men to dugouts that could hold thousands of soldiers. Some sophisticated dugouts, such as the Vampire dugout, were placed more than 10 metres (33 ft) underground, lined with concrete, wood and steel to withstand the shock of artillery, accessed via a set of wooden stairs.

About 180 dugout sites have been located in the Ypres Salient and in the 1990s some of them were entered, at least in part. The level of activity can be gauged by the fact that during 1917 and 1918, more people lived underground in the Ypres area than reside in the town today.

=== Zemlyankas (WWII) ===
In World War II, partisans, or armed resistance fighters in Eastern Europe sometimes lived in dugouts called zemlyankas (Russian or Ukrainian: Землянка) which were used as underground bunkers to provide shelter and a hiding place from enemies. In Poland they were called ziemianki.

=== Russo-Ukrainian War ===
In the ongoing Russo-Ukrainian war, dugouts are used extensively by both sides for similar tactical reasons.

=== Gallery ===
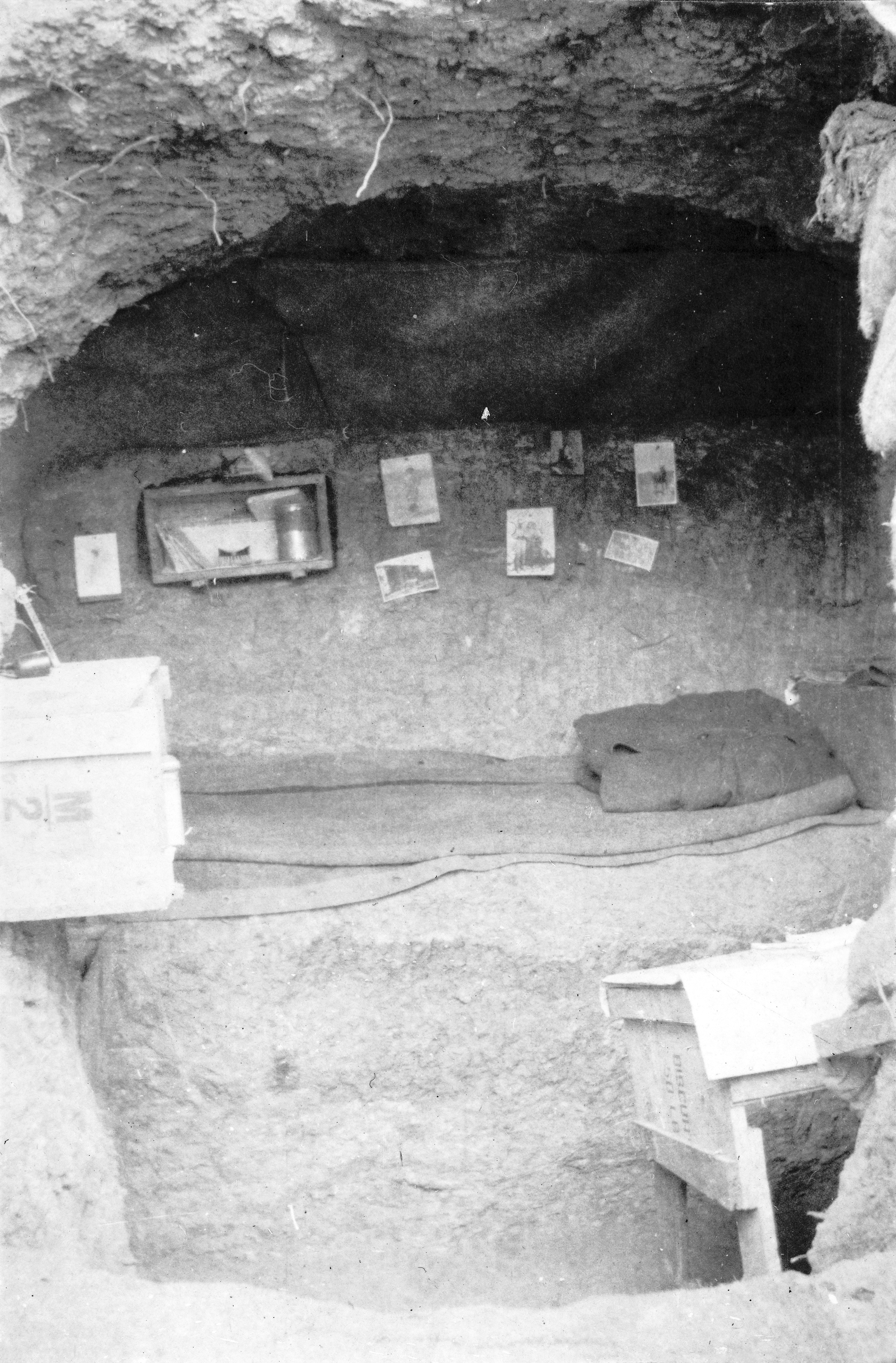
Interior of dugout, Gallipoli, 1915

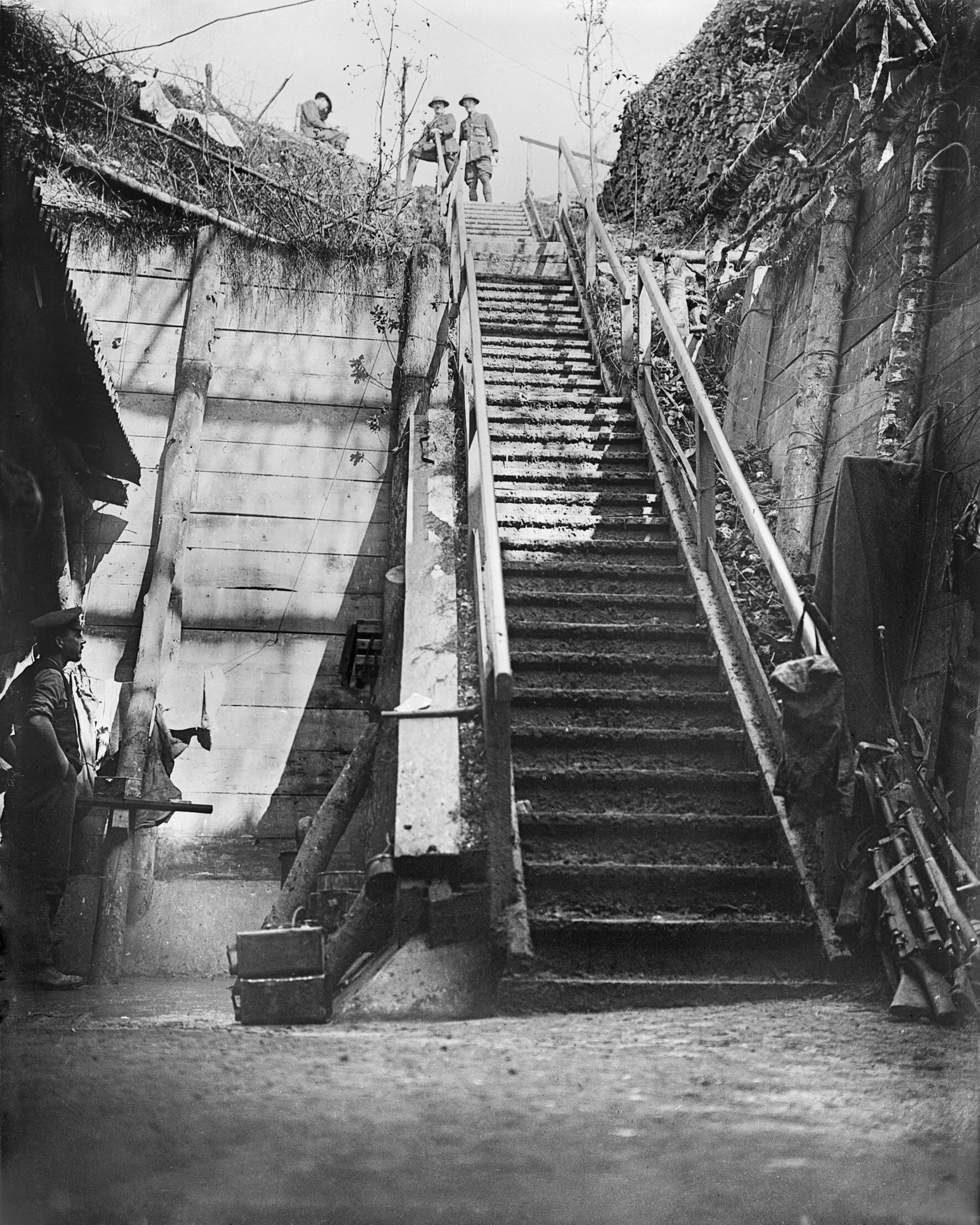
Steps leading down to a German deep dugout at Bernafay Wood, near Montauban, used in the Battle of the Somme, 1916

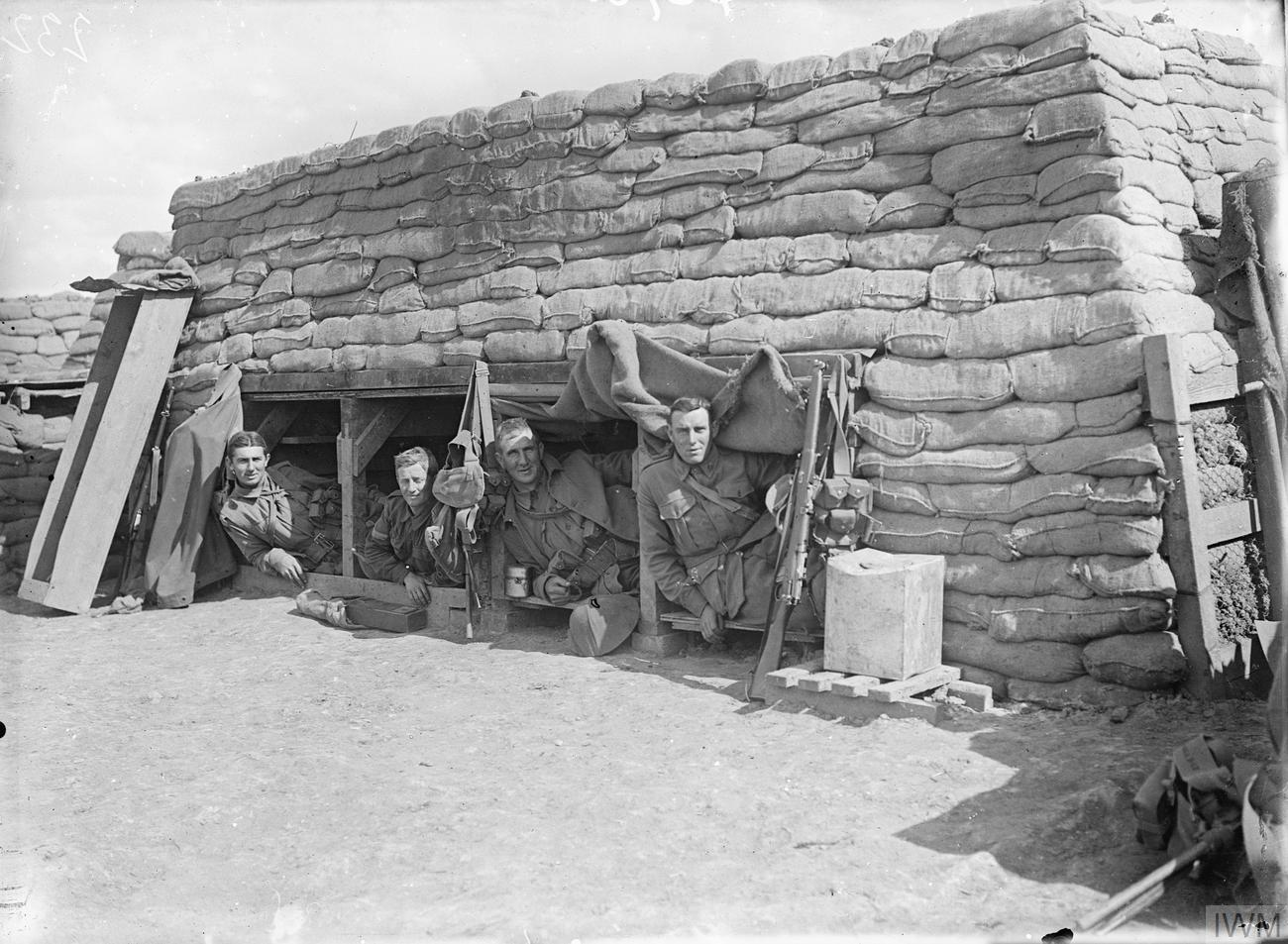
Australian troops in a shelter at Fleurbaix, June 1916. In areas with a high water table and muddy ground, trenches and dugouts were made using aboveground breastworks.

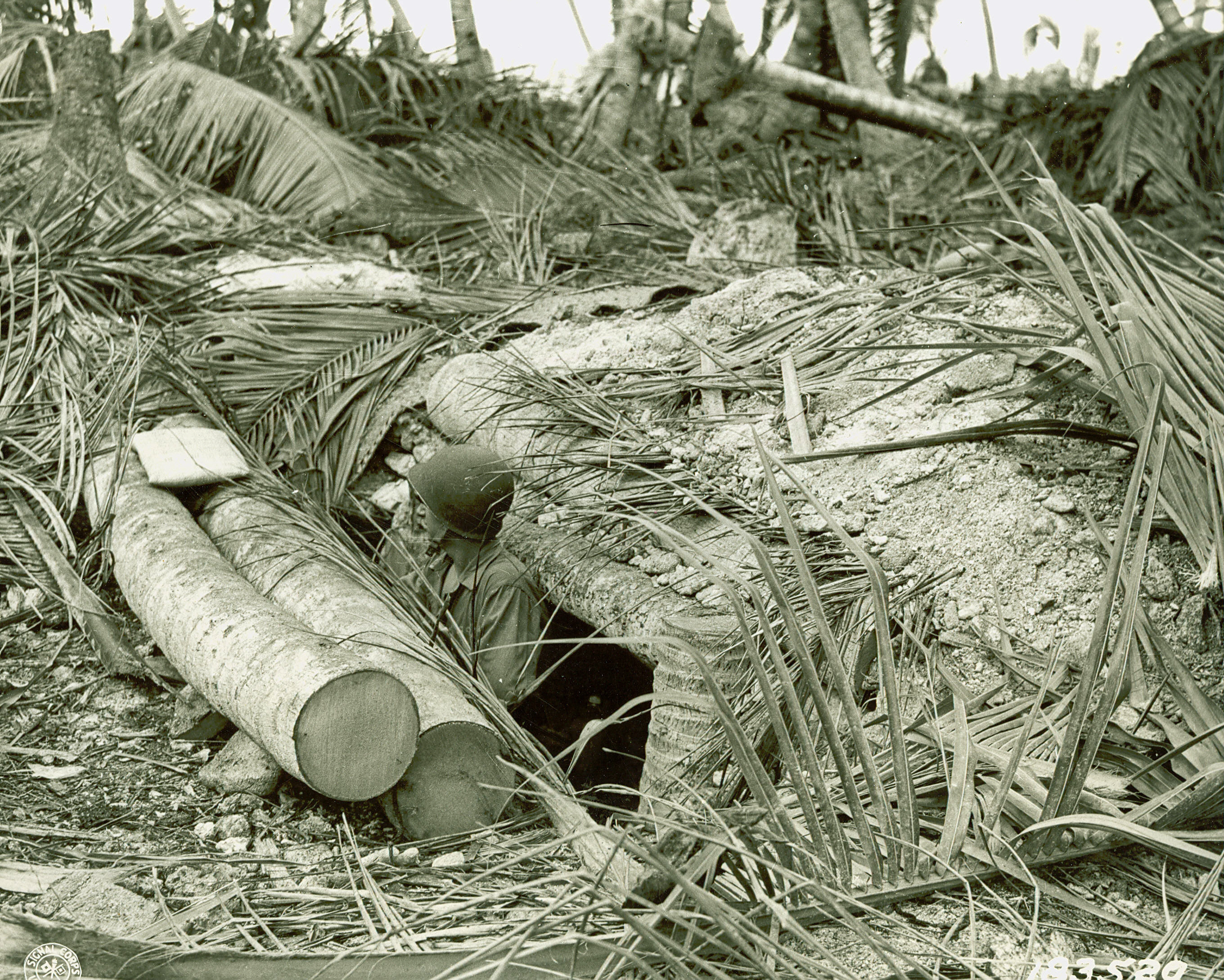
Japanese dugout

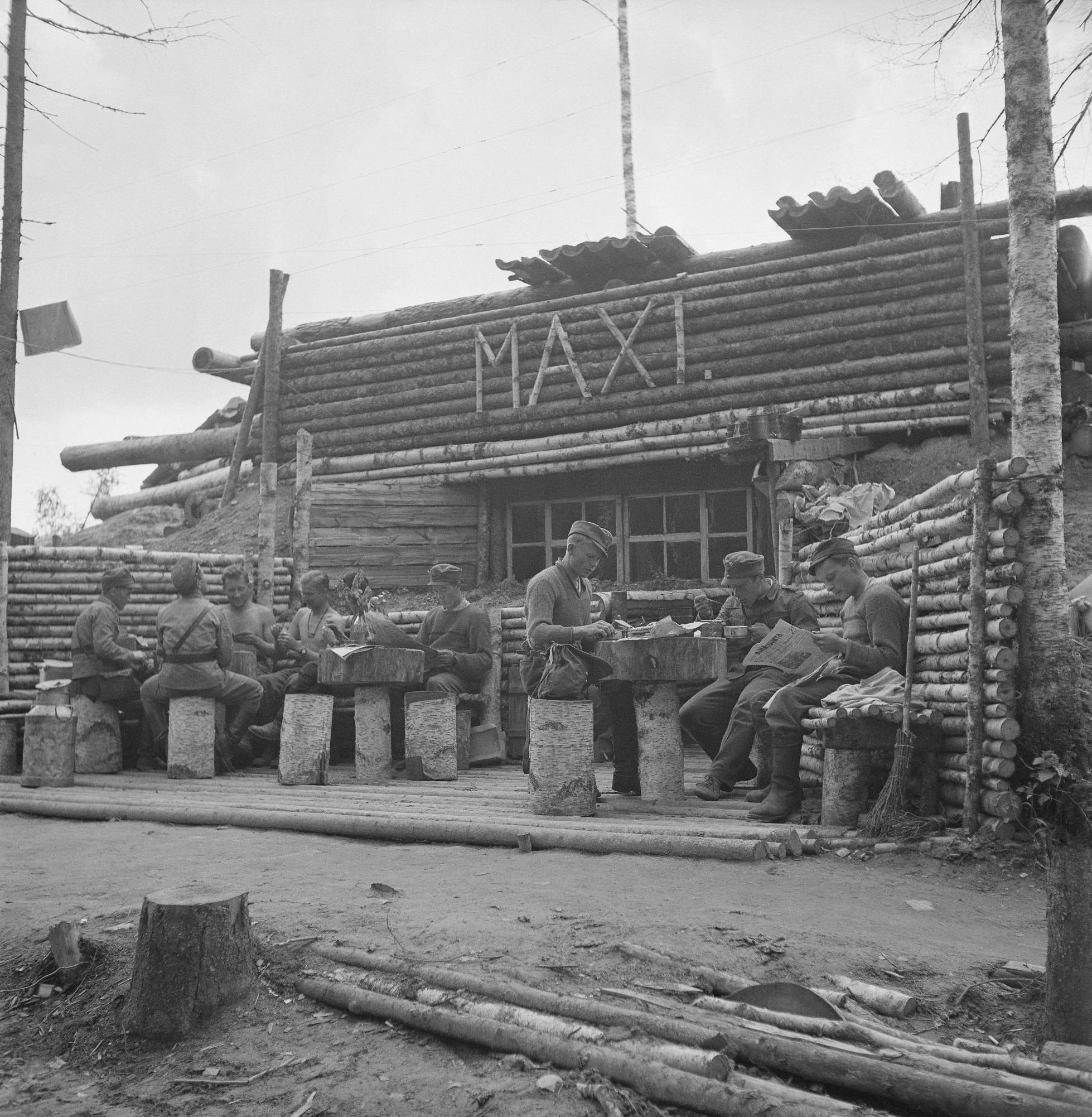
Finnish dugout shelter in Continuation War 1942

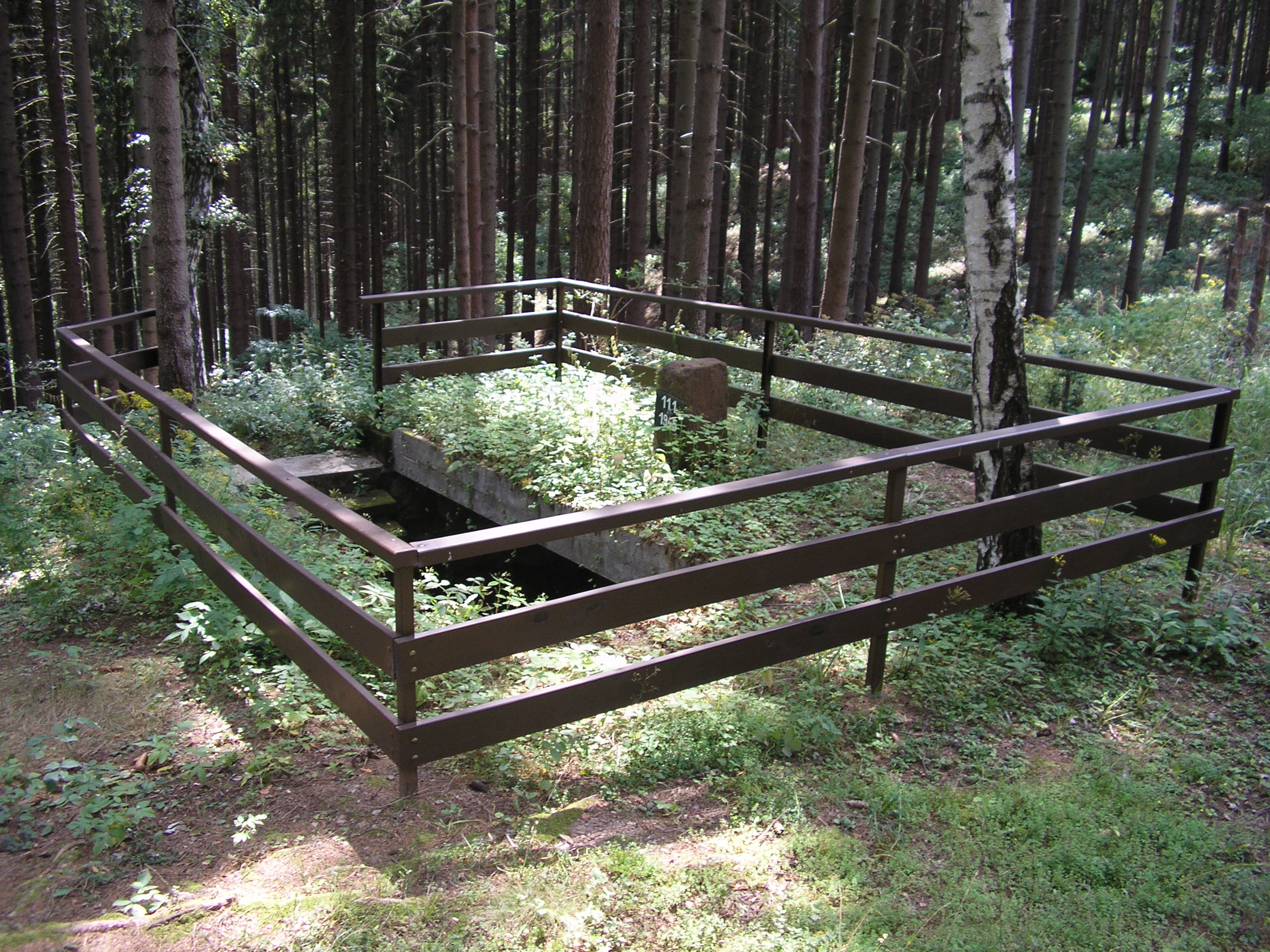
Zemlyanka used by partisans near Nýrov, Czech Republic, preserved as a WWII memorial

== See also ==
- Subterranea (geography): underground structures
- Underground city, umbrella article for underground dwellings and facilities
- Rock-cut architecture
- Blockhouse
- Underground living
- Bunker
- Pillbox (military)

Types of dugouts and other related topics:

- Earth house
- Earth lodge
- Earth sheltering
- Hut
- Pit-house
- Skara Brae an important earth sheltered Neolithic settlement in Scotland
- Sod house
- Secret passage
  - Tunnels in popular culture
