= Burdei =

Type of dwelling

A burdei or bordei (Romanian: bordei, Ukrainian: бурдей) is a type of pit-house or half-dugout shelter, somewhat between a sod house and a log cabin. This style is native to the Carpathian Mountains and forest steppes of Eastern Europe.

In Romania, it is a traditional "rustic" house made of clay and built below the earth's surface. Variations on how deep underground the burdei is built depend between houses. The underground style of construction and the use of clay materials ensures heating with minimal resources during harsh winters. The burdei style is still utilised to this day, usually among shepherd communities in the mountainsides.

The etymology of the word is Romanian, and can be found in Albanian as well, due to a shared Thracian origin. Borde in Albanian means "hole".

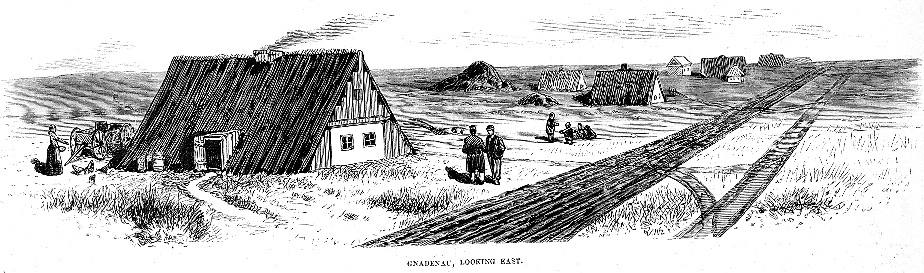
Mennonite burdeis in the village of Gnadenau, Kansas, United States (Frank Leslie's Illustrated Newspaper March 20, 1875)

== History ==
=== Neolithic ===
In the Cucuteni-Trypillian culture burdei houses were characterized by elliptical shapes. These houses would typically have a wooden floor that was about 1.5 meters (5 feet) below ground, which would place the roof at just above ground level.

=== Early middle ages ===
The term used by western historians, for burdei-type housing on the Lower Danube and in the Carpathians during the 6th–7th centuries CE is Grubenhaus. Poluzemlianki is used by Russian researchers. The Russian term refers to a structure partially dug into the ground, often less than 1 m deep.

The Grubenhaus was erected over a rectangular pit, ranging in size from four square meters to twenty-five square meters of floor area. During the 6th and 7th centuries the sunken buildings east and south of the Carpathians, were under 15 square meters in floor surface. The experiments of the Archeological Open-Air Museum in Březno near Louny have reconstructed the living and temperature conditions in the dug houses.

The building experiment consisted of two houses, which were exact replicas of two sunken buildings excavated on the site, one of the late sixth or early seventh century, the other of the ninth. The sixth- to seventh-century feature was relatively large (4.20 x 4.60 m) and deep (80 cm under the original ground). The excavation of the rectangular pit represented some fifteen cubic meters of earth. The excavation, as well as other, more complex, operations, such as binding horizontal sticks on the truss or felling and transport of trees, required a minimum of two persons. The building of the house took 860 hours, which included the felling of trees for rafters and the overall preparation of the wood. Building the actual house required 2.2 cubic meters of wood (ash, oak, and beech). In itself, the superstructure swallowed two cubic meters of wood. Three to four cubic meters of clay were necessary for daubing the walls and reeds harvested from some 1,000 square meters, for the covering of the superstructure. Assuming sixty to seventy working hours per week and a lot more experience and skills for the early medieval builders, the house may have been built in three to four weeks.59 -Florin Curta.

== Eastern Europe ==
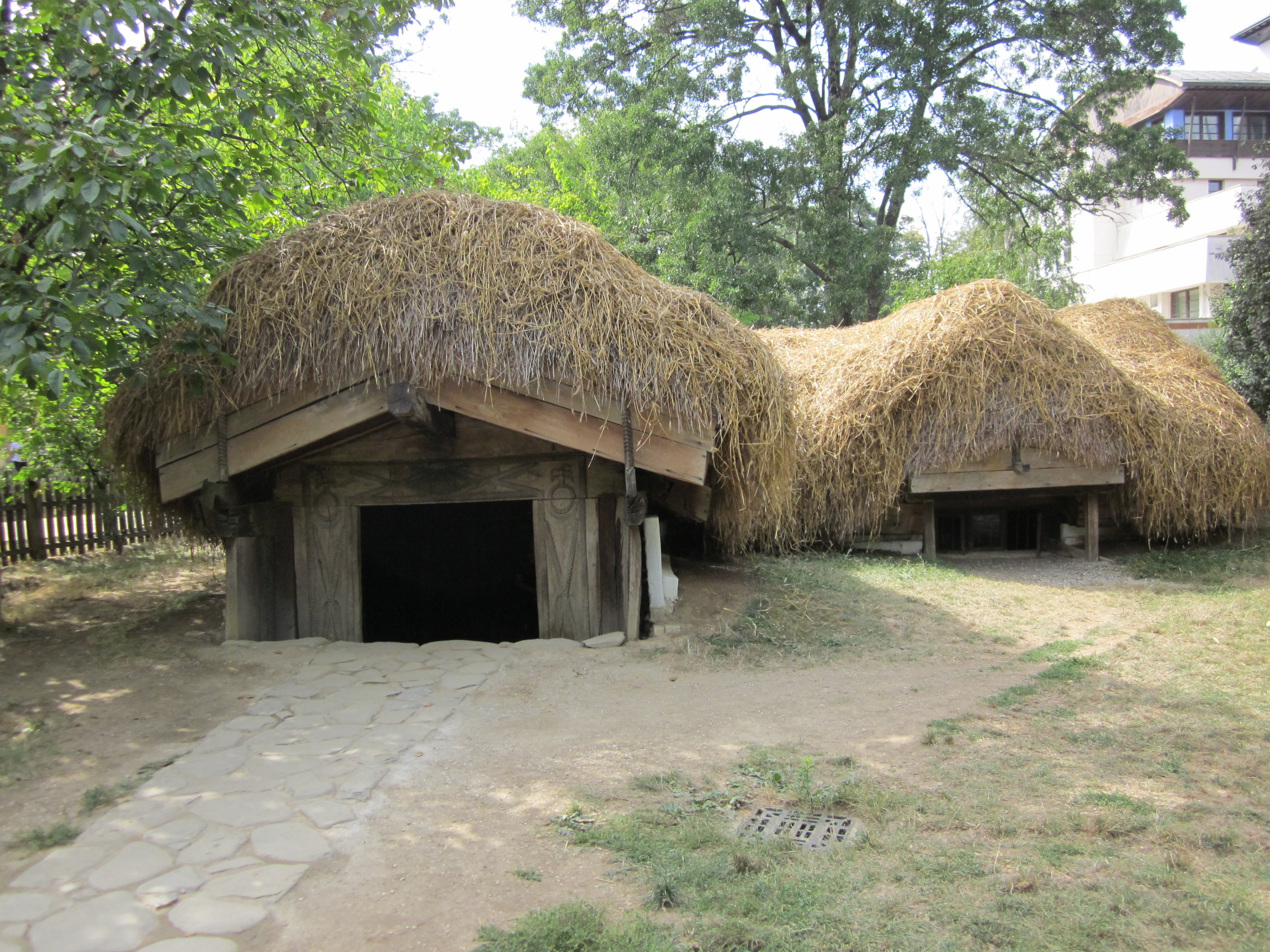
Village Museum "Dimitrie Gusti", Bucharest. Bordei from Drăghiceni, Olt county, 19th century

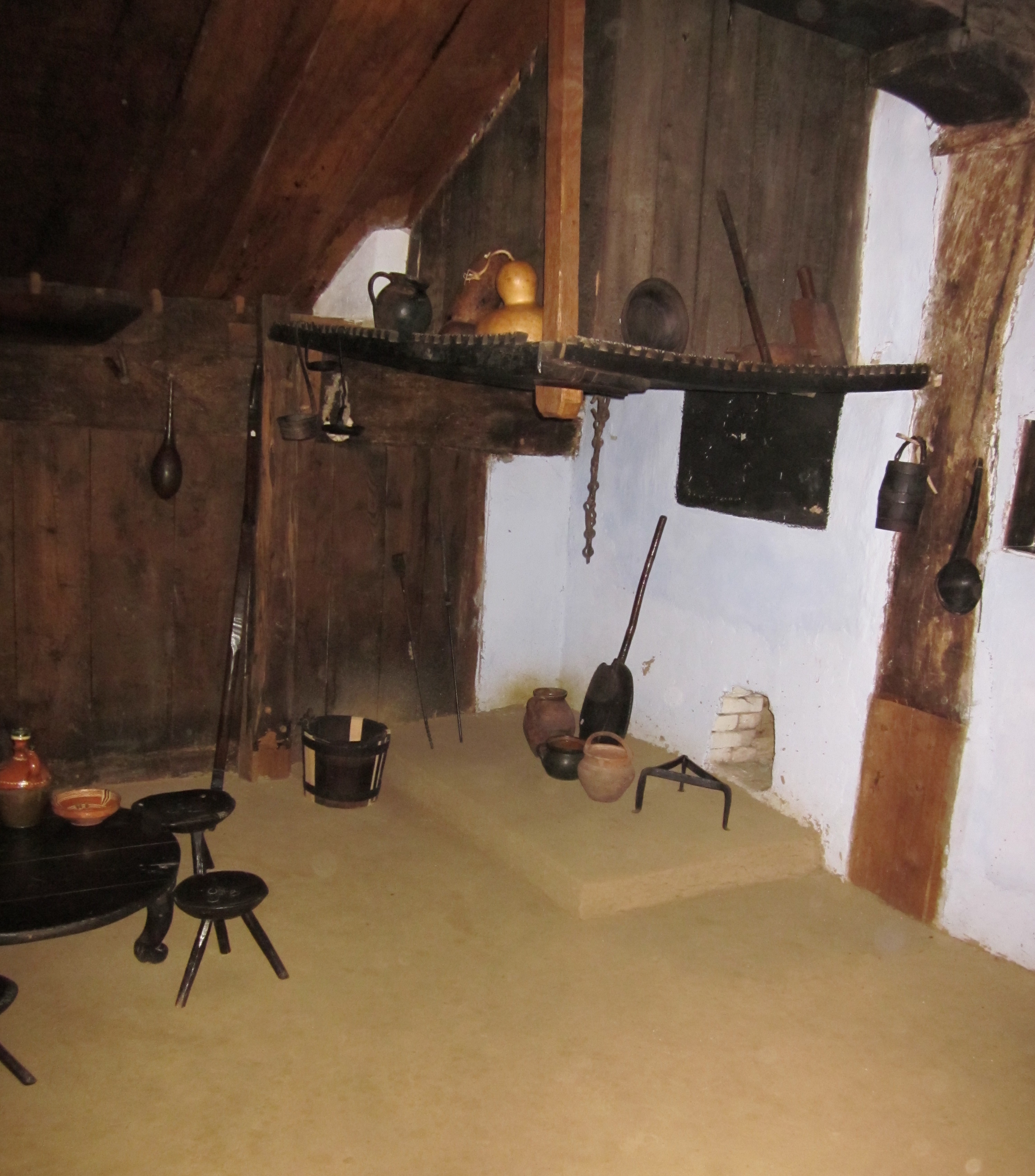
Interior of a bordei (burdei) dwelling. National Village Museum "Dimitrie Gusti", Bucharest

In countries like Romania or Ukraine, the burdei was built to constitute a permanent housing place and could accommodate a whole family. Thus, a burdei could have multiple rooms, typically a fire-room where the stove was installed, a cellar, and a living room.

It is said that when King Charles I came to Romania he saw smoke coming out of the snow on the ground and he asked what it is. He was told "It is the Romanian people, your majesty, they live underground."

== North America ==
This type of shelter was created by many of the earliest Ukrainian Canadian settlers as their first home in Canada at the end of the 19th century. The first step was to peel back and save the sod, then excavate the earth to a depth of approximately a metre. A poplar roof frame was then created, over which the saved sod would be laid. Then a window, a door, a wood stove, and a bed platform would be installed. A typical burdei measured no more than two by four metres. The burdei was a temporary refuge until a "proper" home of poplar logs and mud/straw plaster could be built.

Mennonites from Imperial Russia settled in the Hillsboro region of Kansas, and also built burdei housings as temporary shelters. This type of shelter was also called a zemlyanka or a saraj (a Low German spelling for a Russian word meaning "shed"). The March 20, 1875, issue of the national weekly newspaper Frank Leslie's Illustrated Newspaper described the structures:

...is the quaint brand-new village of Gnadenau, where there are some twenty small farmers, who have built the queerest and most comfortable cheap houses ever seen in the West, and with the least timber, being merely a skeleton roof built on the ground and thatched with prairie-grass. They serve for man and beast, being divided on the inside by a partition of adobe.

—

== See also ==
- ASTRA National Museum Complex
- Culture of Romania
- Cucuteni-Trypillian culture
- Dugout (shelter)
- Earth sheltering
- Pit-house
- Ukrainian Cultural Heritage Village
- Vernacular architecture of the Carpathians
- Village Museum
- Vernacular architecture
- Zemlyanka
