= Nýrov =

- Municipality
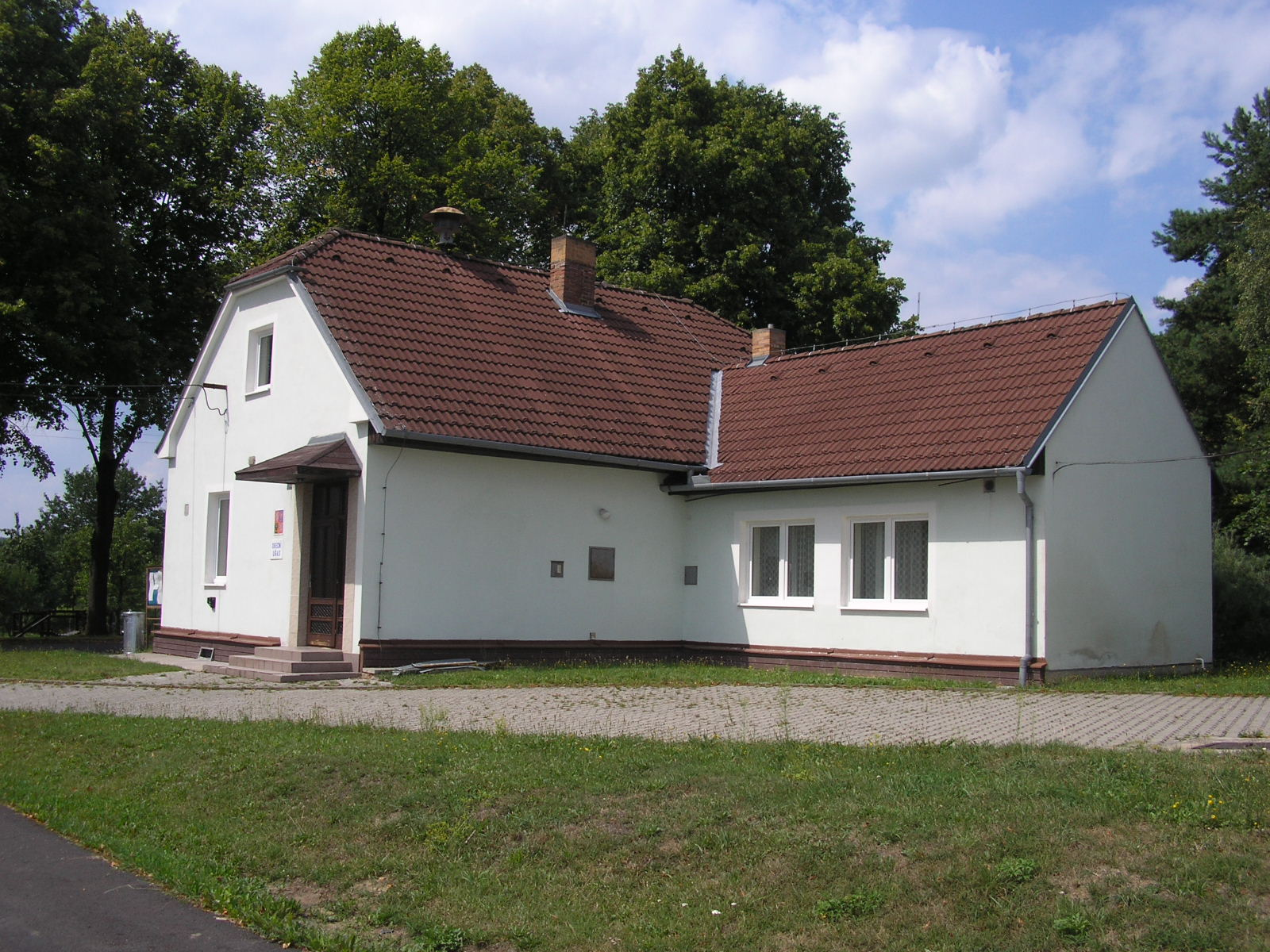
- Municipal office

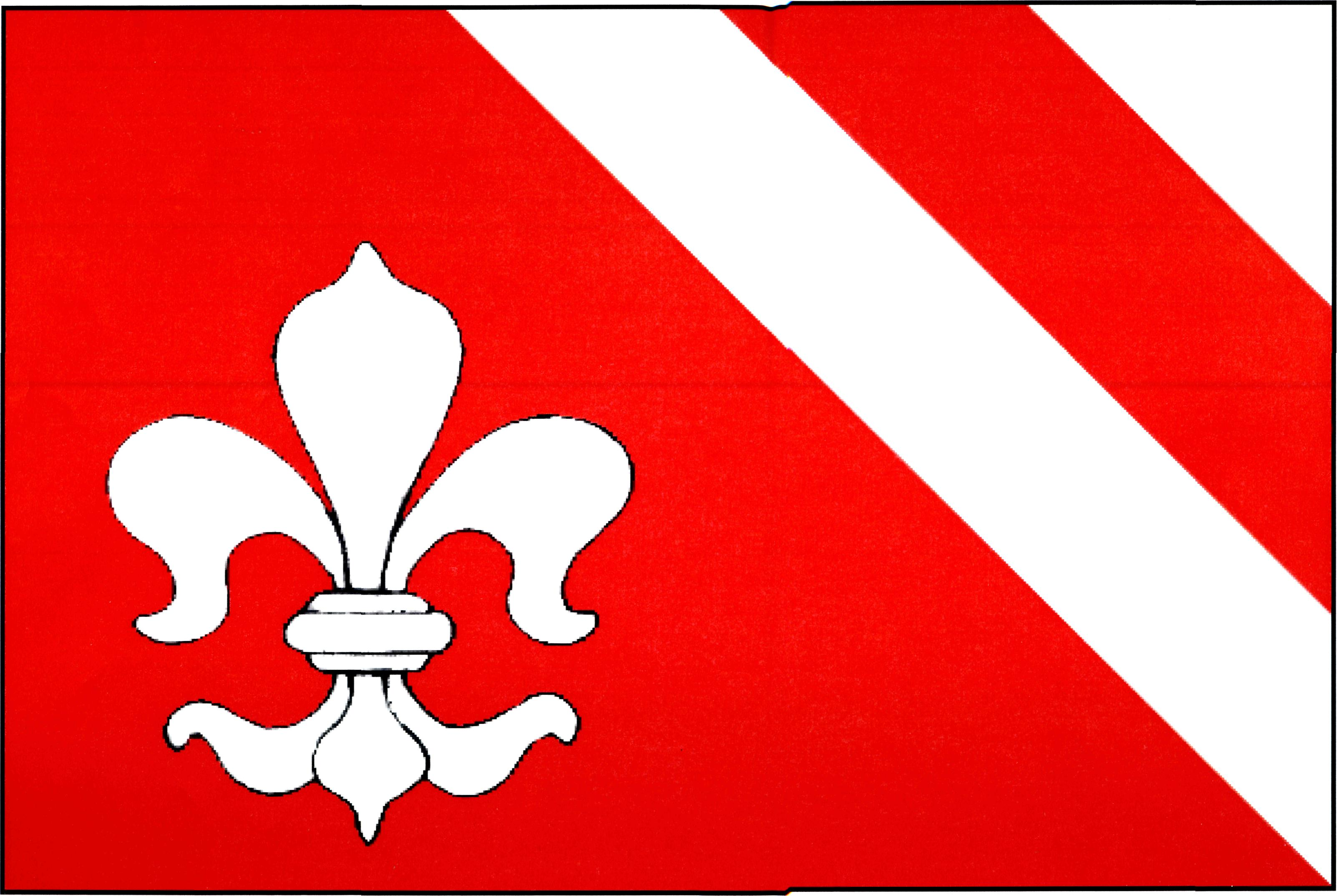
- Flag Coat of arms

- Location in the Czech Republic
- Coordinates: 49°31′31″N 16°32′34″E
- Country: Czech Republic
- Region: South Moravian
- District: Blansko
- First mentioned: 1368

Area
  - Total: 9.17 km^{2} (3.54 sq mi)
- Elevation: 500 m (1,600 ft)

Population (2026-01-01)
  - Total: 227
  - Density: 24.8/km^{2} (64.1/sq mi)
- Time zone: UTC+1 (CET)
  - Summer (DST): UTC+2 (CEST)
- Postal code: 679 72
- Website: www.nyrov.cz

Nýrov is a municipality and village in Blansko District in the South Moravian Region of the Czech Republic. It has about 200 inhabitants.

Nýrov lies approximately 19 kilometres (12 mi) north-west of Blansko, 37 km (23 mi) north of Brno, and 166 km (103 mi) east of Prague.

== Demographics ==
Historical population
Year	Pop.	±%
1869	232	—
1880	242	+4.3%
1890	193	−20.2%
1900	230	+19.2%
1910	253	+10.0%
1921	265	+4.7%
1930	266	+0.4%
1950	247	−7.1%
1961	254	+2.8%
1970	254	+0.0%
1980	251	−1.2%
1991	237	−5.6%
2001	223	−5.9%
2011	203	−9.0%
2021	216	+6.4%
Source: Censuses
