= Earth shelter =

House partially or entirely surrounded by earth

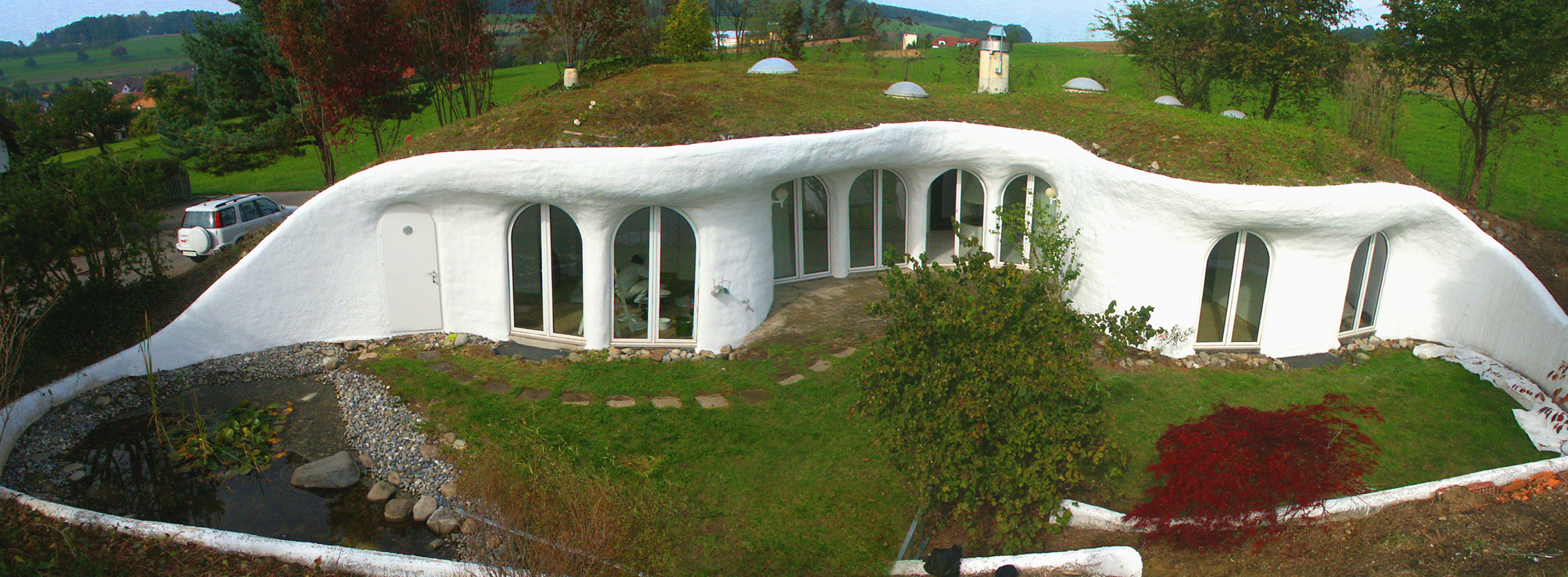
An earth sheltered house in Switzerland (Peter Vetsch)

An earth shelter, also called an earth house, earth home, earth-bermed house, earth-sheltered house, earth-covered house, or underground house, is a structure (usually a house) with earth (soil) against the walls and/or on the roof, or that is entirely buried underground.

Earth acts as thermal mass, making it easier to maintain a steady indoor air temperature and therefore reduces energy costs for heating or cooling.

Earth sheltering became relatively popular after the mid-1970s, especially among environmentalists. However, the practice has existed for nearly as long as humans have been constructing their own shelters.

== Definition ==
- "Earth-sheltering is [...] a generic term with the general meaning: building design in which soil plays an integral part." This definition is problematic however, since earth structures (e.g. rammed earth or cob) are not usually considered as earth shelters as they are above ground.
- "A building can be described as earth-sheltered when it has a thermally significant amount of soil or substrate in contact with its external envelope, where “thermally significant” means making a functional contribution to the thermal effectiveness of the building in question.
- "Structures built with the use of earth mass against building walls as external thermal mass, which reduces heat loss and maintains a steady indoor air temperature throughout the seasons."
- "A residence with an earth covering for its roof or walls."
- "Homes that have been built underground, either partially or completely."
- "The use of earth cover to moderate and improve living conditions in buildings."

== Design and construction ==
=== Design ===
Earth sheltered homes are often constructed with energy conservation and savings in mind. Specific designs of earth shelters allow for maximum savings. For bermed or in-hill construction, a common plan is to place all the living spaces on the side of the house facing the equator (or north or east, depending on latitude). This provides maximum solar radiation to bedrooms, living rooms, and kitchen spaces. Rooms that do not require natural daylight and extensive heating such as the bathroom, storage, and utility room are typically located on the opposite (or in-hill) side of the shelter. This type of layout can also be transposed to a double level house design with both levels completely underground. This plan has the highest energy efficiency of earth sheltered homes because of the compact configuration as well as the structure being submerged deeper in the earth. This gives it a greater ratio of earth cover to an exposed wall than a one-story shelter would.

The soil type is one of the essential factors during site planning. The soil needs to provide adequate bearing capacity and drainage, and help to retain heat. With respects to drainage, the most suitable type of soil for earth sheltering is a mixture of sand and gravel. Well-graded gravels have a large bearing capacity (about 8,000 pounds per square foot (39,000 kg/m^{2})), excellent drainage and a low frost heave potential. Sand and clay can be susceptible to erosion. Clay soils, while least susceptible to erosion, often do not allow for proper drainage, and have a higher potential for frost heaves. Clay soils are more susceptible to thermal shrinking and expanding. Being aware of the moisture content of the soil and the fluctuation of that content throughout the year will help prevent potential heating problems. Frost heaves can also be problematic in some soil. Fine grain soils retain moisture the best and are most susceptible to heaving. A few ways to protect against capillary action responsible for frost heaves are placing foundations below the freezing zone or insulating ground surface around shallow footings, replacement of frost-sensitive soils with granular material, and interrupting capillary draw of moisture by putting a drainage layer of coarser material in the existing soil.

Water can damage earthen shelters if it ponds around them. Avoiding sites with a high water table is crucial. Drainage, both surface and subsurface, must be properly dealt with. Waterproofing applied to the building is essential.

Atrium designs have an increased risk of flooding, so the surrounding land should slope away from the structure on all sides. A drain pipe at the perimeter of the roof edge can help collect and remove additional water. For bermed homes, an interceptor drain at the crest of the berm along the rooftop's edge is recommended. An interceptor drainage swale in the middle of the berm is also helpful or the back of the berm can be terraced with retaining walls. On sloping sites, runoff may cause problems. A drainage swale or gully can be built to divert water around the house, or a gravel-filled trench with a drain tile can be installed along with footing drains.

Soil stability should also be considered, especially when evaluating a sloping site. These slopes may be inherently stable when left alone, but cutting into them can greatly compromise their structural stability. Retaining walls and backfills may have to be constructed to hold up the slope prior to shelter construction.

On land that is relatively flat, a fully recessed house with an open courtyard is the most appropriate design. On a sloping site, the house is set right into the hill. The slope will determine the location of the window wall; the most practical orientation in moderate to cold climates is a south-facing exposed wall in the Northern hemisphere (and north-facing in the Southern hemisphere) due to solar benefits. The most practical orientation in the Tropics nearest the equator is north-facing toward the aphelion (or perhaps northeast) to moderate the temperature extremes. Just outside the Tropics, the most practical way to avoid afternoon heat excess may be an east-facing house or, if near a west coast, exposure of the east end and the west end, with the two long sides embedded in the earth.

Depending on the region and site selected for earth-sheltered construction, the benefits and objectives of the earth shelter construction vary. For cool and temperate climates, objectives consist of retaining winter heat, avoiding infiltration, receiving winter sun, using thermal mass, shading and ventilating during the summer, and avoiding winter winds and cold pockets. For hot, arid climates objectives include maximizing humidity, providing summer shade, maximizing summer air movement, and retaining winter heat. For hot, humid climates objectives include avoiding summer humidity, providing summer ventilation, and retaining winter heat.

Regions with extreme daily and seasonal temperatures emphasize the value of earth as a thermal mass. Earth sheltering is most effective in regions with high cooling and heating needs and high-temperature differentials. In regions such as the southeastern United States, earth sheltering may need additional care in maintenance and construction due to condensation problems in regard to the high humidity. The ground temperature of the region may be too high to permit earth cooling if temperatures fluctuate only slightly from day to night. Preferably, there should be adequate winter solar radiation and sufficient means for natural ventilation. Wind is a critical aspect to evaluate during site planning, for reasons regarding wind chill and heat loss, as well as shelter ventilation. In the Northern Hemisphere, south facing slopes tend to avoid cold winter winds typically blown in from the north. Fully recessed shelters also offer adequate protection against these harsh winds. However, atria within the structure can cause minor turbulence depending on the size. It is helpful to take advantage of the prevailing winds in the summer. Because of the limited window arrangement in most earth shelters, and the resistance to air infiltration, the air within a structure can become stagnant if proper ventilation is not provided. By making use of the wind, natural ventilation can occur without the use of fans or other active systems. Knowing the direction, and intensity, of seasonal winds, is vital in promoting cross ventilation. Vents are commonly placed in the roof of bermed or fully recessed shelters to achieve this effect.

=== Building materials ===
The selection of construction materials should consider the type of structure, site characteristics, climate, soil type, and design. Stronger, longer-lasting building materials are required for structures that are buried deeply. Waterproof and insulated materials should also be utilized to withstand the pressure and moisture of the surrounding ground. For instance, concrete and reinforced masonry, wood, and steel are all viable materials. Concrete is the most common choice for earth-sheltered buildings due to its strength, durability, and fire resistance. Cast-in-place concrete is employed for non-critical structural elements such as concrete foundations, floor slabs, and exterior walls with less than 6 feet (1.8 meters) of earth cover. In contrast, precast reinforced concrete can be used for floors, walls, and roofs. Concrete masonry units should be 8 inches (200 millimeters) or greater, with the use of “A” or “H” facilitating unit placement around vertical reinforcing bars, depending on the required structural integrity. It is typically advised to use Type S mortar, grout with a minimum strength of 2,000 psi (14 MPa), and a concrete slab with a minimum strength of 2,500 psi (17 MPa) and 4 inches (100 mm) thickness. Brick or stone masonry reinforced with steel bars can be utilized for walls that will be subjected to lateral or vertical pressure from earth cover. Masonry generally costs less than cast-in-place concrete. Wood can be widely employed in earth-sheltered buildings for structural and internal work, including floors, roofs, and exterior walls. However, wooden frame walls, which must endure lateral pressure, are limited to a burial depth of one story when used as a structural material. Beyond this depth, the cost will rapidly increase while using wood as a structural material. Although wood can be less expensive than other materials, it lacks steel's strength, therefore it might not be the ideal option for structural material in some earth-sheltered dwellings, especially in moist soil type. Steel is used for beams, columns, bar joists, and masonry reinforcement. The advantage is that steel has high tensional and compressional strength, while the disadvantage is that it must be protected from corrosion if it is exposed to air, water, or other chemicals. It must be used effectively because it is also expensive.

=== Excavation ===
In earth-sheltered construction, there is often extensive excavation done on the building site. An excavation several feet larger than the walls' planned perimeter is made to allow for access to the outside of the wall for waterproofing and insulation.

=== Foundations ===
Once the site is prepared and the utility lines installed, a foundation of reinforced concrete is poured. The walls are then installed. Usually, they are either poured in place or formed either on or off-site and then moved into place. Reinforced concrete is the most common choice. The process is repeated for the roof structure. If the walls, floor, and roof are all to be poured in place, it is possible to make them with a single pour. This can reduce the likelihood of there being cracks or leaks at the joints where the concrete has cured at different times. The foundation of the buildings designed by Vetsch are built conventionally.

=== Walls ===
Several different methods of external (load-bearing) wall construction in earth shelters have been used successfully. These include concrete block (either conventionally mortared or surface-bonded), stone masonry, cordwood masonry, poured concrete, and pressure-treated wood. Earthships classically use rammed earth tire walls, which are labor-intensive but recycle used tires.

Oehler prescribed a very low budget method he termed "post, shoring and polyethylene". This involves buried wooden posts to act as a frame, shored up with planks, and with a waterproofing barrier of polyethylene sheet between the planks and the backfill, but no foundation and nothing on the floor except a plastic sheet and carpeting.

Untreated wood in direct contact with earth rots within five years of use in earth shelter construction, but can be used for structural support construction in a well-insulated and water/moisture-proofed home. Reinforced concrete is the most commonly used structural material in earth shelter construction. It is strong and readily available. Steel can be used but needs to be encased by concrete to keep it from direct contact with the soil which corrodes the metal. Bricks and concrete masonry units are also possible options in earth shelter construction but must be reinforced to keep them from shifting under vertical pressure unless the building is constructed with arches and vaults.

Unfortunately, reinforced concrete is not the most environmentally sustainable material. The concrete industry is working to develop products that are more environmentally friendly in response to consumer demands. Products like Grancrete and Hycrete are becoming more readily available. They claim to be environmentally friendly and either reduce or eliminate the need for additional waterproofing. However, these have not been extensively used in earth shelter construction yet.

=== Roof ===
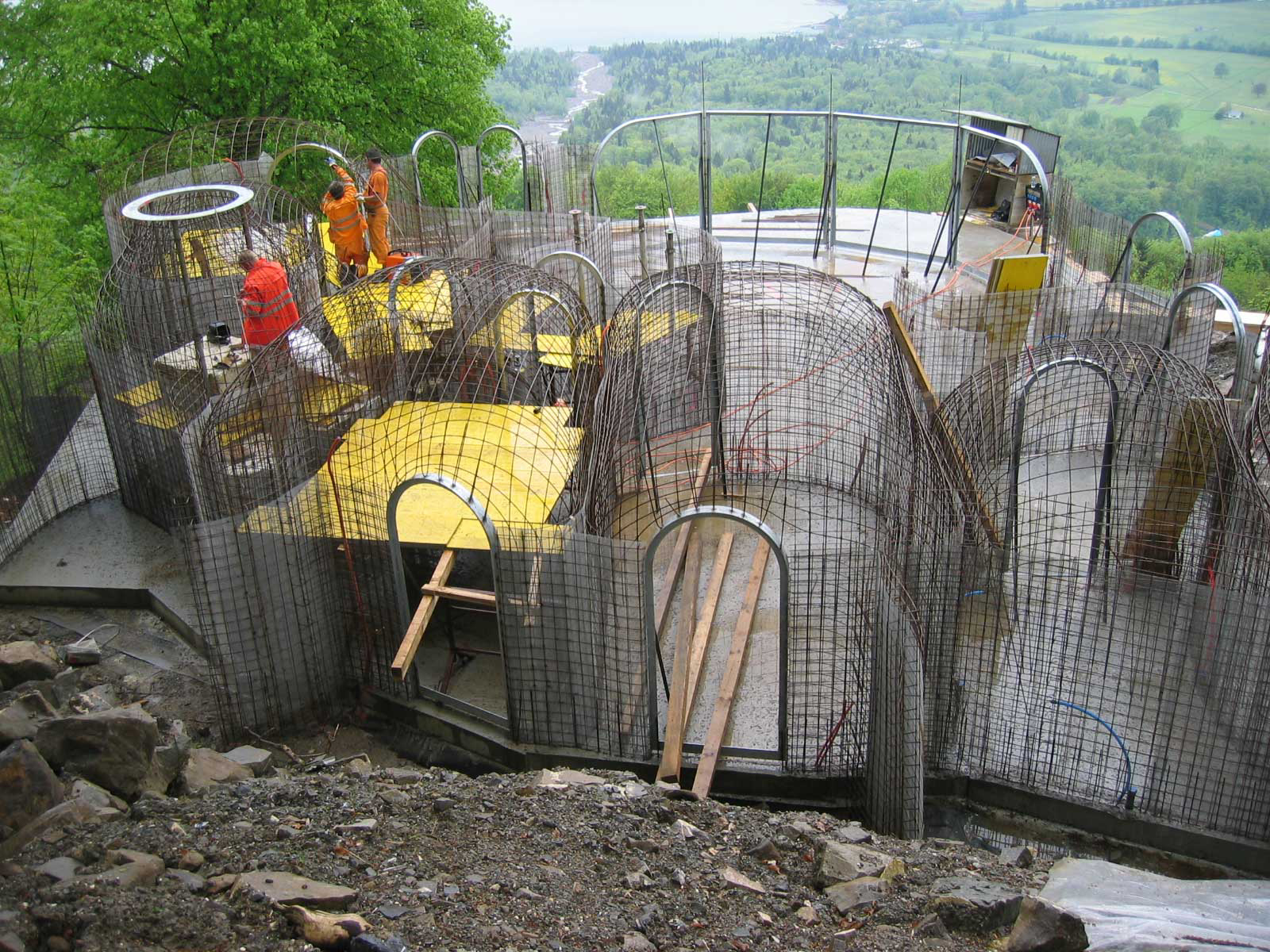
Meshed metal stretch net construction

The roof of an earth shelter may not be covered by earth (earth berm only), or the roof may support a green roof with only a minimal thickness of earth. Alternatively a larger mass of earth might cover the roof. Such roofs must deal with significantly greater dead load and live load (e.g. increased weight of water in the earth after rain, or snow). This requires stronger and more substantial roof support structure. Some advise to have just enough thickness of earth on the roof to maintain a green roof (approximately 6 inches / 15 cm), since this means less load on the structure. Increasing the amount of earth on the roof past this gives only modest increases in the benefits while increasing costs significantly.

Despite being underground, drainage of water is still important. Therefore, earth shelters do not tend to have flat roofs. A flat roof is also less resistant to the weight of the earth. It is common for earth shelter designs to have arches and shallow domed roofs since this form resists vertical load well. One method uses finely meshed metal bent into the intended shape and welded to the supporting armature. Onto this mesh concrete is sprayed forming a roof. Terra-Dome (USA) is a company specializing in construction of earth-sheltered houses and sells a modular system of concrete domes intended to be covered by earth. Others advise the use of timber framed, gable roofs of pitch at least 1:12 to promote drainage. The roofs of Earthships tend to be mono-pitched, classically using vigas.

=== Waterproofing ===
On the outside of the concrete, a waterproofing system is applied. The most frequently used waterproofing system includes a layer of liquid asphalt onto which a heavy grade waterproof membrane is affixed, followed by a final liquid water sealant which may be sprayed on. It is very important to make sure that all of the seams are carefully sealed. It is very difficult to locate and repair leaks in the waterproofing system after the building is completed. Several layers are used for waterproofing in earth shelter construction. The first layer is meant to seal any cracks or pores in the structural materials, also working as an adhesive for the waterproof membrane. The membrane layer is often a thick flexible polyethylene sheeting called EPDM rubber. EPDM is the material usually used in a water garden, pond and swimming pool construction. This material also prevents roots from burrowing through the waterproofing. EPDM is very heavy to work with and can be chewed through by some common insects like fire ants. It is also made from petrochemicals, making it environmentally unsustainable.

There are various cement-like coatings that can be used as waterproofing. The product is sprayed directly onto the unprotected surface. It dries and acts like a huge ceramic layer between the wall and earth. The problem with this method is, if the wall or foundation shifts in any way, it cracks and water is able to penetrate through it easily.

Bituthene (registered name) is very similar to the three coat layering process only in one step. It comes already layered in sheets and has a self-adhesive backing. Applying it manually is the same as with the layering method, in addition, it is sun sensitive and must be covered very soon after application.

Eco-Flex is an environmentally friendly waterproofing membrane that seems to work very well on foundations, but not much is known about its effectiveness in earth sheltering. It is among a group of liquid paint-on waterproofing products. The main challenge with these products are they must be carefully applied, making sure that every area is covered to the right thickness, and that every crack or gap is tightly sealed.

Bentonite clay is an alternative that the most environmentally friendly. It is naturally occurring and self-healing. The drawback to this material is that it is very heavy, difficult for the owner/builder to install, and subject to termite damage.

Bi-membranes have been used extensively throughout Australia where 2 membranes are paired together—typically 2 coats of water-based epoxy as a 'sealer' and stop the internal vapor pressure of the moist concrete exploding bubbles of vapor up underneath the membrane when exposed to hot sun. The bond strength of epoxy to concrete is stronger than the internal bond strength of concrete so the membranes won't 'blow' off the wall in the sun. Epoxies are very brittle so they are paired up with an overcoat of a high-build flexible water-based acrylic membrane in multiple coats of different colors to ensure film coverage—this is reinforced with non-woven polypropylene textile in corners and changes in direction.

=== Insulation ===
One or more insulation board or foam layers are added outside the waterproofing. If the insulation chosen is porous, a top layer of waterproofing is added. Unlike the conventional building, earth shelters require the insulation on the exterior of the building rather than inside the wall. One reason for this is that it protects the waterproof membrane against freeze damage, another is that the earth shelter is able to better retain its desired temperature. There are two types of insulation used in earth shelter construction. The first is close-celled extruded polystyrene sheets. Two to three inches glued to the outside of the waterproofing is generally sufficient. The second type of insulation is a spray on foam (e.g. polyurethane solid foam insulation). This works very well where the structure's shape is unconventional, rounded or difficult to get to. Foam insulation requires an additional protective top coat such as foil or fleece filter to help it resist water penetration.

In some low budget earth shelters, insulation may not be applied to the walls. These methods rely on the earth's U factor or thermal heat storage capacity below the frost layer. These designs are the exception however and risk frost heave damage in colder climates. The theory behind no insulation designs relies on using the earth's thermal mass to store heat, rather than relying on a heavy masonry or cement inner structures that exist in a typical passive solar house. This is the exception to the rule and cold temperatures may extend down into the earth above the frost line making insulation necessary for higher efficiencies.

=== Backfilling ===
After previous construction stages are complete, the earth is backfilled against the external walls to create the berm. Depending on the drainage characteristics of the earth may not be suitable to place in direct contact with the external wall. Some advise that topsoil and turf (sod) be put aside from the initial excavation and be used for the grass roof and to place as the topmost layer on the berm.

=== Finishings ===
In the earth houses designed by Vetsch, interior walls are furnished using loam rendering, providing superior humidity compensation. The loam rendering is finally coated with lime-white cement paint.

== Types ==
Three main types of earth shelter are described. There is also great variation in the approach to earth sheltering in terms of materials used and expenditure. The "low tech" approach might involve natural building techniques, wooden posts and shed style roofs, recycling of materials, owner labor, hand excavation, etc. The relatively more high tech approach would be larger, using concrete and steel. While typically more energy efficient post construction, the high tech approach has higher embodied energy and significantly more costs.

=== Bermed ===
In the earth bermed (also termed "bunded") type, earth is banked against the exterior walls, sloping down away from the building. The berm can be partial or total. The polar facing wall may be bermed, leaving the equator-facing wall un-bermed (in temperate regions). Usually this type of earth shelter is built on, or only slightly below the original grade. Due to the building being above the original ground level, fewer moisture problems are associated with earth berming in comparison to underground/fully-recessed construction, and it costs less to construct. According to one report, earth berming provided 90-95% of the energy advantage as a completely below grade structure.

=== In-hill ===
The in-hill (also termed "earth covered", or "elevational") construction is where the earth shelter is set into a slope or hillside, and earth covers the roof in addition to the walls. The most practical application is using a hill facing towards the equator (south in the Northern Hemisphere and north in the Southern Hemisphere), towards the aphelion (north) in the Tropics, or east just outside the Tropics. There is only one exposed wall in this type of earth sheltering, the wall facing out of the hill, all other walls are embedded within the earth/hill. This is the most popular and energy efficient form of earth shelter in cold and temperate climates.

=== Underground ===
The true underground (also termed "chambered" or "subterranean") earth shelter describes a house where the ground is excavated, and the house is set in below grade. They can feature an atrium or courtyard constructed in the middle of the shelter to provide adequate light and ventilation. The atrium is not always fully enclosed by raised ground, sometimes a U-shaped atrium is used, which is open on one side.

With an atrium earth shelter, the living spaces tend to be located around the atrium. The atrium arrangement provides a much less compact plan than that of the one or two-story bermed/in hill design; therefore it is commonly less energy efficient, in terms of heating needs. Therefore, atrium designs are found mainly in warmer climates. However, the atrium does tend to trap air within it which is then heated by the sun and helps reduce heat loss. Atrium designs are well suited to flat sites, and are fairly common.

=== Other types ===
Depending on what definition of earth sheltering is used, other types are sometimes included. In culvert homes ("Cut and Cover"), precast concrete containers and large diameter pipes are arranged into a connecting design to form a living space and then backfilled with earth. An experimental construction design from the 1980s of Japan, coined 'Alice City', proposed to use a wide and deep cylindrical shaft sunk into the earth, with a domed skylight roof. Artificial caves can be constructed by making a tunnel into the earth. Building greenhouses underground has also been speculated about. Schools, commercial centres, government buildings and other buildings could be built underground.

== Applications ==
=== Active and passive solar ===
Earth sheltering is often combined with solar heating systems. Most commonly, the utilization of passive solar design techniques is used in earth shelters. In most of the Northern Hemisphere, a south-facing structure with the north, east, and west sides covered with earth is the most effective application for passive solar systems. A large double glazed or triple glazed window spanning most of the length of the south wall is critical for solar heat gain. It is helpful to accompany the window with insulated drapes to protect against heat loss at night. Also, during the summer months, providing an overhang, or some sort of shading device, is used to block out any excess solar gain.

Using these strategies, earth shelters are capable of high energy efficiency and remain comparable with other types of passive solar constructions. The typical earth shelter’s thermal integrity factor, which is a measurement used to evaluate a building’s thermal performance, is significantly better than traditional above-ground constructions.

=== Passive annual heat storage ===
Passive annual heat storage (PAHS) is a building concept theorized to create a year-round constant temperature in an earth shelter by means of direct gain passive solar heating and a thermal battery effect lasting several months. It is claimed that an earth shelter designed according to these principles would store the sun's heat in the summer and release it slowly over the winter months without need for other forms of heating. This method was first described by inventor and physicist John Hait in his 1983 book. The main component of it is an insulated and waterproof "umbrella" which extends out from the earth shelter for several meters in all directions. Hence the term "umbrella house". The earth under this umbrella is kept warm and dry relative to surrounding earth, which is subject to constant daily and seasonal temperature changes. This creates a large heat storage area of earth, effectively a huge thermal mass. Heat is gained via passive solar in the earth shelter and transferred to the surrounding earth by conduction. Thus, when the temperature in the earth shelter dips below the temperature in the surrounding earth, heat will return to the earth shelter. After a time, a stable temperature is reached which is an average of annual heat changes in the external environment. Some criticize the technique (along with the earth sheltering technique as a whole), stating concerns including difficulty and expense of construction, moisture and lack of evidence.

The effectiveness of PAHS is primarily dependent on the orientation of an earth shelter’s facade and its depth below grade. For the strategy to create an efficient means of passive heating and cooling, a shelter must maximize the area of the exterior facade that is in contact with the earth. The walls of an in-hill shelter, for example, have less exposure to the earth and more potential for direct solar heat gain than an underground shelter, making it more difficult to draw heat away in the summer months. By contrast, an underground shelter can regulate its year-round temperature more effectively since a larger percentage of its facade is fully subterranean.

=== Annualized geo solar ===
Another design aimed at passive seasonal energy storage, annualized geo solar is sometimes applied to earth shelters.

=== Earth tube ventilation ===
Earth tube ventilation is a form of passive cooling and heating that draws outdoor air, either by mechanical fan or convection, through a ground-coupled heat exchanger before depositing the air into an indoor living space. By doing so, the air temperature is regulated by the near-constant temperature of the underground tubes through convective heat transfer. Earth tube ventilation can be best applied to earth shelters when certain conditions are met. Because the system relies on the constant movement of air, a sufficiently high opening on the ceiling or wall must act as an outlet. Particularly during the summer months, the stack effect facilitates air movement through the earth tubes only if these outlets remain slightly open. The operation of earth tubes in an earth shelter poses potential challenges during the winter months. If either the inlet or the building’s doors and windows remain closed to prevent warm air from escaping, fresh air cannot be delivered to the living space which produces a less desirable indoor air quality.

== History ==
=== Early history ===
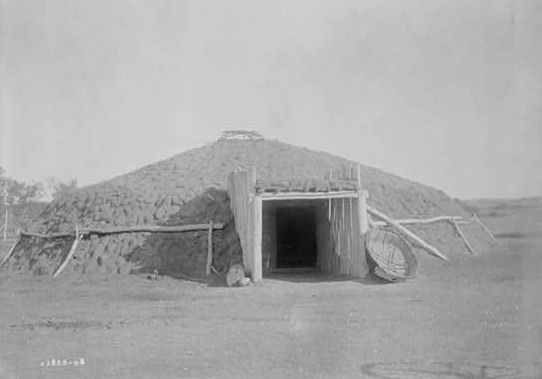
Mandan lodge, North Dakota. c. 1908

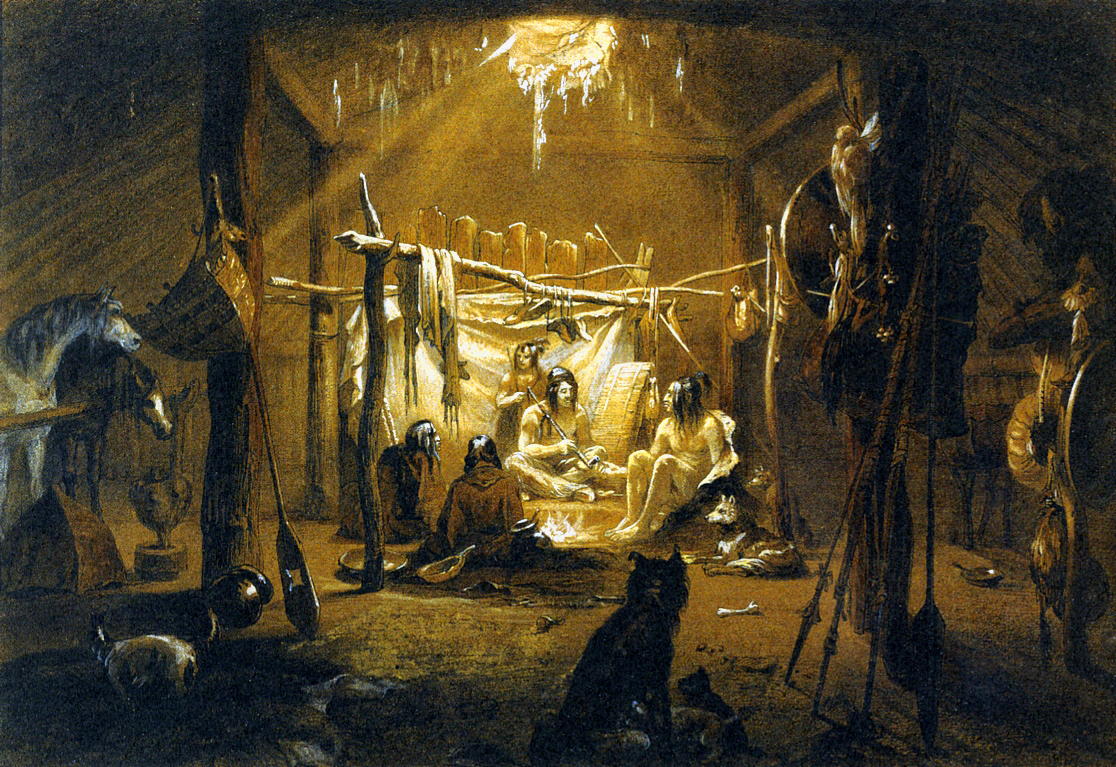
"The interior of the hut of a Mandan Chief": aquatint by Karl Bodmer from the book "Maximilian, Prince of Wied's Travels in the Interior of North America, during the years 1832–1834"

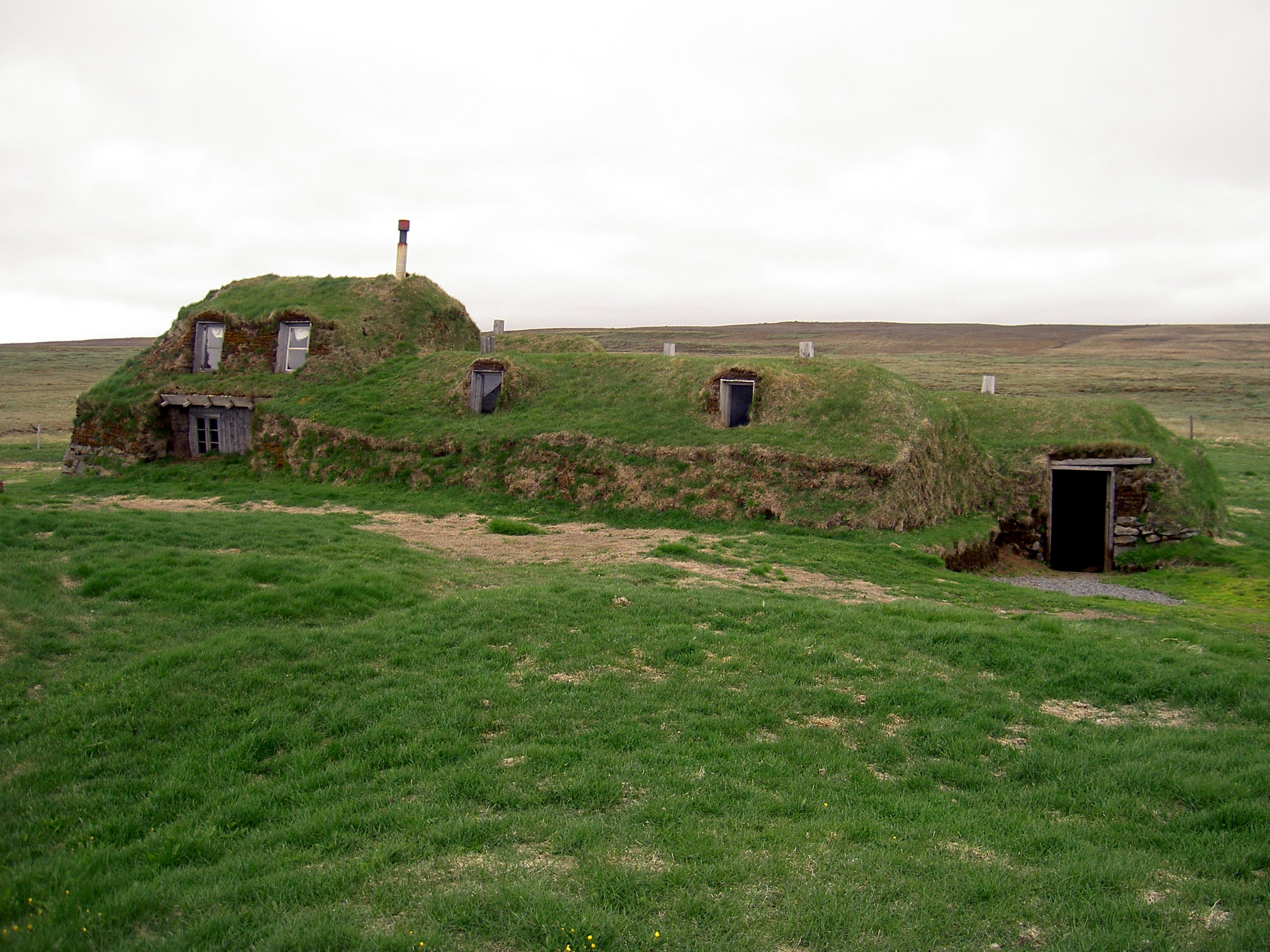
Turf house in Sænautasel, Iceland.

Earth sheltering is one of the oldest forms of building. It is thought that from about 15,000 BC migratory hunters in Europe were using turf and earth to insulate simple round huts that were also sunk into the ground. The use of some form of earth sheltered construction is found across many cultures in history, distributed widely across the world. Normally these examples of cultures using earth sheltered buildings occur without any knowledge of the construction method elsewhere. These structures have many different forms and are referred to by many different names. General terms include pit-house and dugout.

One of the oldest examples of berming, dating back some 5,000 years, can be found at Skara Brae in the Orkney Islands off northern Scotland. Another historical example of in-hill earth shelters would be Mesa Verde, in southwest USA. These building are constructed directly onto the ledges and caves on the face of the cliffs. The front wall is built up with local stone and earth to enclose the structure.

In North America, almost every native American group used earth sheltered structures to some extent. These structures have been called 'earth lodges' (see also: Barabara). When Europeans colonized North America, sod houses ("soddies") were common on the Great Plains.

In China, man-made cave dwellings have been used as a shelter since 2,000 BC. In certain areas of northern China, like the provinces of Shaanxi and Shanxi, since the loess earth is structurally uniform and compacted, providing easy access to good quality building material with stable structure, earth-sheltered homes have been in use for centuries.

=== 1970s–1980s heyday ===
The 1973 Oil Crisis saw the price of oil dramatically increase, which influenced vast social, economic and political changes worldwide. Combined with growing interest in alternative lifestyles and the back-to-the-land movement, the public of the US and elsewhere were becoming more interested in saving energy and protecting the environment.

As early as the 1960s in the US, some innovators were designing contemporary earth shelters. After the oil crisis and until the early 1980s there was a new resurgence in interest earth shelter/underground home construction, which has been termed the first wave of earth-covered dwellings. Architect Arthur Quarmby finished an earth sheltered building in Holme, England in 1975. Named "Underhill," It is recorded in the Guinness World Records as the "first underground house" in the UK.

The majority of publications about earth sheltering date to this period, with dozens of books dedicated to the topic being published in the years leading up to 1983. The first International Conference on Earth-Sheltered Buildings was hosted in Sydney, Australia in 1983. A second conference was planned for 1986 in Minneapolis, USA.

Other notable proponents of earth sheltering active in this era include Mike Oehler, Rob Roy, John Hait, Malcolm Wells, Peter Vetsch, Ken Kern and others.

=== Modern times ===
Since the late 1980s, earth-sheltered homes have become increasingly popular. The technique is more common in Russia, China and Japan. It is possible that Northern China has more earth shelters than any other region. As of 1987, approximately 10 million people live in underground homes in the region.

Some claim that thousands of people live underground in Europe and America. Notable European examples are the "Earth Houses" of Swiss architect Peter Vetsch. There are about 50 such earth shelters in Switzerland, including a residential estate of nine earth shelters (Lättenstrasse in Dietikon). In other parts of Europe, such as the UK, earth sheltering is more uncommon. Possibly the most well known examples of modern earth sheltering in the English-speaking world are Earthships, the brand of passive solar earth shelters sold by Earthship Biotecture. Earthships are concentrated in New Mexico, US.

Overall earth shelter construction is often viewed by architects, engineers, and the public as an unconventional method of building. Techniques of earth sheltering have not become common knowledge, and much of society is unaware of this type of building construction. Generally speaking, the cost of excavation, increased need for damp-proofing and the requirement for the structure to withstand greater weight relative to above grade houses means that earth sheltering remains relatively rare. In this respect, the Passive House (PassivHaus) energy performance standard applied to above grade airtight, superinsulated low carbon or zero carbon buildings has had much wider uptake in modern times. Over 20,000 buildings certified to PassivHaus standards have been constructed across Northern Europe. Some postulate that over time the reducing availability of building space, and the increasing need and interest for environmentally friendly housing will make earth shelters more common.

There are an estimated 30-40 million Chinese living in such earth homes today still, mostly along the Yellow River in Northern China. There are mainly two kinds of earth homes in the area. The first type is pit cave dwellings. Usually, people dig a sunken courtyard, which is a rectangular underground pit about 10 meters deep, then arrange rooms dug off the main courtyard. The second type is dwelling space carved out of earth cliffs which are often south-facing, and the facades are sometimes faced with bricks or stone. They usually come with larger courtyards since it doesn't bother to excavate.

== Comparison with standard housing ==
=== Measured and simulated thermal performance ===
The soil around an earth-sheltered building acts as thermal mass. It heats up and cools down slowly, so its temperature changes much less than air outside. A 2024 review of research found that, because of this, earth-sheltered buildings usually need less heating and cooling than similar buildings above ground, and their indoor temperatures stay more stable during the year. The authors added that the results depend on the type of soil and the local climate.

Studies of real houses have measured this effect. Two of them looked at Earthships, a type of house with walls made of tires filled with earth and covered with soil on three sides. One Earthships in Taos, New Mexico, had no heating or cooling system. Over a full year, the outdoor temperature went from -22.1°C to 34.8°C, but the bedroom stayed between 16.7°C and 27.7°C. In the United Kingdom, the Brighton Earthship stayed at about 13°C during the coldest days of February 2005, before anyone lived there. The researchers said that the house would still need some extra heat in winter to be comfortable, for example from the people living in it and their appliances.

Research also shows some limits. A computer study for New Delhi, checked against measured ground temperatures, found that the more a building touched the soil, the more stable its indoor temperature was. A fully underground design stayed warmer on average than designs with sloping earth berms.

Greenhouses attached to Earthships can also get too hot. In the Taos study, the warmest indoor temperature happened in February, and it could have been avoided by opening the greenhouse vents. The 2024 review also lists humidity, ventilation and daylight as ongoing design problems. Climate matters too. A study of earth-sheltered house with a heat pump and solar panels at nine sites in Europe found that it could make more energy than it used during the heating season in southern and Atlantic areas, but not in the far north.

=== Advantages ===
In 1981, Oehler promoted his low-budget building design (a simple hole in the ground with walls of wooden planks backed by plastic sheeting) by claiming it needed no foundation, used less building material and labour, had less maintenance, was aesthetically pleasing, had a lower taxation rate in the US at the time, cost less to regulate temperature, was less affected by stormy weather, had pipes which wouldn't freeze where they entered the house, were "ecologically sound", relatively fireproof, soundproof and had an increased garden space as compared to regular house on a similarly sized plot of land.

He also claimed the view from a window below the ground was better than that from other windows, and that the flooring he used in his an underground home (plastic sheeting over bare dirt) was "superior" to what is elsewhere available.

He claimed he would provide a built-in greenhouse in the design.

He claimed his homes could be used as fallout shelters in case of nuclear wars and also claimed that, in the case of complete societal collapse, his design would be more defensible than a regular house in the case of random attacks, as well as being better concealed from potential hostiles (without a map and unfamiliar with the area). He believed that underground, inhabitants would be better protected from "atmospheric radiation" (fallout). Because his design was not waterproofed, one would be "closer to a source of water", and could potentially simply dig a well in the middle of the room.

He furthermore claimed anyone could build one of his designs irrespective of skill or ability for only $50.

==== Passive heating and cooling ====
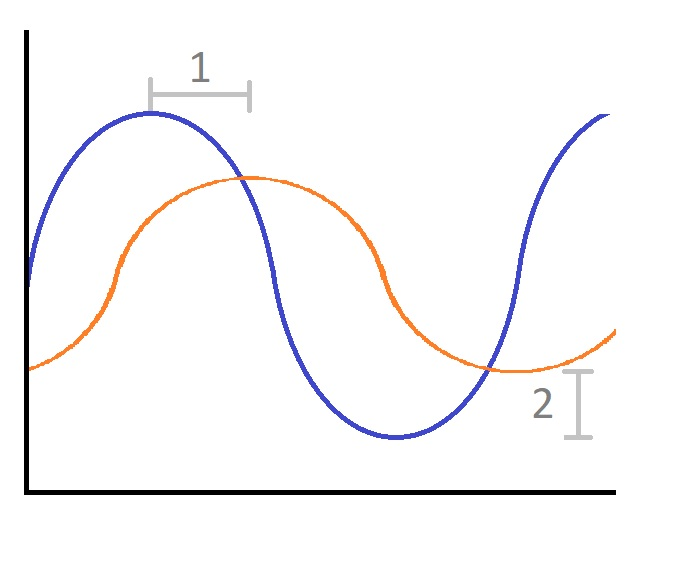
Diagram showing effect of thermal mass and insulation in an earth sheltered structure. y-axis represents temperature; x-axis represents time. Blue line: external temperature fluctuations between day maximum and night minimum (could also represent Summer maximum and Winter minimum temperature fluctuation on a longer timescale). Red line: Internal temperature. 1: Phase shifting (delay between maximum/minimum external temperature and internal temperature). 2: Amplitude dampening (the reduction in maximum or minimum internal temperature relative to that of the external temperature).

Due to its density, compacted earth acts as thermal mass, meaning that it stores heat and releases it again slowly. Compacted soil is more of a conductor of heat than an insulator. Soil is stated as having an R-value of about 0.65-R per centimeter (0.08-R per 1 inch), or 0.25-R per 1 inch. Variations in R-value of soil may be attributed to different soil moisture levels, with lower R values as moisture level increases. The most superficial layer of earth typically is less dense and contains the root systems of many different plants, thereby acting more like thermal insulation, meaning, it reduces the rate of temperature flowing through it.

Approximately 50% of the heat from the Sun is absorbed at the surface. Consequently, the temperature at the surface may vary considerably according to the day / night cycle, according to weather and particularly according to season. Underground, these temperature changes are blunted and delayed, termed thermal lag. The thermal properties of earth therefore mean that in winter the temperature below the surface will be higher than the surface air temperature, and conversely in summer the earth temperature will be lower than the surface air temperature.

Indeed, at a deep enough point underground, the temperature remains constant year round, and this temperature is approximately the mean of summer and winter temperatures. Sources vary in their stated values for this deep earth constant temperature (also termed amplitude correction factor). Reported values include 5–6 m (16–20 ft), 6 m (20 ft), 15 m (49 ft), 4.25 m (13.9 ft) for dry soil, and 6.7 m (22 ft) for wet soil. Below this level the temperature increases on average 2.6 °C (5 °F) every 100 m (330 ft) due to heat rising from the interior of the Earth.

Diurnal temperature changes between maximum and minimum temperatures can be modelled as a wave, as can seasonal temperature changes (see diagram). In architecture, the relationship between the maximum fluctuations of external temperature compared to internal temperature is termed amplitude dampening (or temperature amplitude factor). Phase shifting is the time taken for the minimum external temperature to reach the interior.

Partially covering a building with earth adds to the thermal mass of the structure. Combined with insulation, this results in both amplitude dampening and phase shifting. In other terms, earth sheltered structures receive both a degree of cooling in summer and heating in winter. This reduces need for other measures of heating and cooling, saving energy. A potential disadvantage of a thermally massive building in cooler climates is that after a prolonged period of cold, when the external temperature increases again, the structures internal temperature tends to lag behind and take longer to warm up (assuming no other form of heating).

The reduction of air infiltration within an earth shelter can be advantageous. Because three walls of the structure are mainly surrounded by earth, very little surface area is exposed to the outside air. This alleviates the problem of warm air escaping the house through gaps around windows and door. Furthermore, the earth walls protect against cold winter winds which might otherwise penetrate these gaps. However, this can also become a potential indoor air quality problem. Healthy air circulation is key.

As a result of the increased thermal mass of the structure, the thermal lag of the earth, the protection against unwanted air infiltration and the combined use of passive solar techniques, the need for extra heating and cooling is minimal. Therefore, there is a drastic reduction in energy consumption required for the home compared to homes of typical construction.

==== Wind protection ====
The unique architecture of earth houses protects them against severe windstorms. They cannot be torn away or tipped over by strong winds. Structural engineering and, above all, the lack of corners and exposed parts (roof), eliminate vulnerable surfaces which would otherwise suffer from storm damage.

==== Natural resource saving ====
Compared with the material needs of standard buildings, earth-sheltered homes can greatly reduce the number of natural resources. Traditional wood structure home requires lumber for framing and interior finishes, which is quite a big demand. Soil as the main building material and blending in with the landscape, earth-sheltered houses drastically reduce the demand for lumber.

==== Biological effects ====
Earth homes organically embrace animals and poultry as well as water, soil, and plants. Arcology studies the relationship between animals and plants and man-made buildings during ecological development. For example, raising poultry and domesticated animals is an important part of the traditional Chinese rural human settlements and these elements create a stable and sustainable ecological cycle that benefits the environment.

==== Landscape protection and land use ====
Compared to conventional buildings, earth houses can fit into their surroundings. The soil-covered roofs hide the building within the landscape.

Some claim that the construction method is advantageous to the nitrogen-fixation of the soil on the roof, because it would otherwise be covered by the foundation of a traditional house. Contrary to conventional roofs, earth-house roofs allow plants to grow semi-naturally on them.

Such houses can also be built as terraced structures on a slope in hilly terrain.

==== Fire protection ====
Compared to other building materials, such as wood, earth houses feature efficient fire protection owing both to the use of concrete and the insulation provided by the roof. Taking the example of Earthships, there is a reported case where the structure survived fire better compared to other types of buildings.

==== Earthquake protection ====
While residents of earth sheltered homes report noticing more minor earthquakes, the homes are resilient against large earthquakes, as their subterranean nature allows them to move with the earth. Picture a small twig house sitting on top of a tub of dirt: Shake the dirt, and the house will dance and stress. But if you bury the house in the dirt, you can shake the tub without stressing the house as much.

==== Roof planting ====
Roof covering is done using the excavated material, in which plants can be planted.

==== Nuclear bomb survivability ====
Due to the mass of the earth between the living area of an earth house and the surface grade, an earth home offers significant protection from impact/blast damage, or fallout associated with a nuclear bomb.

==== Soundproof ====
Earth shelters may provide privacy from neighbors, as well as soundproofing. The ground provides acoustic protection against outside noise. This can be a major benefit in urban areas or near highways.

==== Architectural aesthetics ====
Earth sheltered dwelling express itself with the color harmony of soil and earth. Meanwhile, the material properties of soil and earth give earth homes the simplicity of geomatic masses. Also, earth homes blend in perfectly with the landscape and highlight the beauty of the surroundings, which is a significant basis of the arcology concept. For example, yaodong and pit cave dwellings in Northern China hide themselves underground and blend in perfectly within the Loess plateau environment. Salt Cathedral in a halite mountain near the city of Zipaquirá, Colombia hugs the contour and highlights the natural features.

=== Disadvantages ===
==== Financial cost ====
Three main factors influence overall cost of home construction, namely, design complexity, materials used, and whether the owner(s) carries out some or all of the construction or pays others to do it. Custom houses with complex designs tend to be more expensive and take longer to build than stock houses. Houses which use expensive materials will be more expensive than houses which use low cost materials. Owner labor can dramatically cut construction costs.

Both earth sheltered projects and construction of regular houses have significant variability in the design, materials and labor involved. As such it is difficult to make a precise comparison of cost between the two, however in general an earth shelter is much more expensive.

A small "underground home" built in the style of Oehler, as only a simple, non-waterproofed hole in ground with simple planks and a plastic sheet to a wall, despite using free labour (ignoring the opportunity costs of not having time to go to work) and recycled materials, e.g. windows and planks for the wall, is estimated to be 30% cheaper to construct when compared to paying a contractor to build a regular house using new construction materials at standard prices, although Oehler's design will quickly rot and collapse after a few years.

A particular factor that strongly influences the cost of an earth shelter is the amount of earth that covers it. The more earth covering the structure, the greater the expense is needed in having a structure capable of withstanding the load (see also: Roof). Another important cost factor that tends to be unique to earth shelters is site excavation and backfilling. The amount of waterproofing is also more costly. On the other hand, earth shelters should have lower maintenance costs since they are mostly covered with little exposed exterior.

Many financial institutions outright exclude financing on earth-sheltered homes, or require this type of property to be common for the area.

==== Design complexity ====
Overall it is more technically challenging to design an earth shelter compared to a regular home. Because of the unorthodox design and construction of earth-sheltered homes, local building codes and ordinances may need to be researched and/or navigated. Many construction companies have limited or no experience with earth-sheltered construction, potentially compromising the physical construction of even the best designs. The specific architecture of earth houses usually leads to non-righted, round-shaped walls, which can cause problems concerning the interior decoration, especially regarding furniture and large paintings.

Repairs to the walls are very difficult to service; and may require re-evaluating and rebuilding the house from scratch.

An earth shelter cannot be enlarged with an extra room - this will require breaking the waterproofing sealant cladding the concrete walls of the building.

==== Sustainability ====
In "green building", four "lifetime" phases of a building are described, namely material sources, construction, in use, and deconstruction (life-cycle assessment). Terms carbon zero and negative carbon buildings refer to the net greenhouse gas emissions over these four phases. Questions therefore arise as to whether certain structures are truly environmentally friendly. For example, raw materials must be extracted from the earth, transported and then manufactured into building materials and transported again to be sold and finally transported to the build site. A lot of fossil fuels may be used during each of these stages.

Earth sheltering often requires heavier construction materials to resist the weight of the earth against the walls and/or roof. Reinforced concrete in particular needs to be used in much larger quantities per building. The manufacture of concrete is a major source of greenhouse gases.

The materials involved tend to be non-biodegradable substances. Because the materials must keep water out, they are often made of plastics. The excavation of a site is also drastically time- and labor-consuming. Overall, the construction is comparable to conventional construction, because the building requires minimal finishing and significantly less maintenance.

==== Moisture and indoor air quality ====
Problems of water seepage, internal condensation, bad acoustics, and poor indoor air quality can occur if an earth shelter has not been properly designed and ventilated. Very high humidity levels can allow mold or mildew growth, associated with a musty smell and potentially with health problems. The below-ground orientation of many earth-sheltered homes can allow accumulation of radon gas (which is known to increase the risk of lung cancer) or other undesirable materials (e.g. off gassing from construction materials).

The threat of water seepage occurs around areas where the waterproofing layers have been penetrated. Earth usually settles gradually. Vents and ducts emerging from the roof can cause specific problems due to the possibility of movement. Precast concrete slabs can have a deflection of 1/2 inch or more when the earth/soil is layered on top of them. If the vents or ducts are held rigidly in place during this deflection, the result is usually the failure of the waterproofing layer. To avoid this difficulty, vents can be placed on other sides of the building (besides the roof), or separate segments of pipes can be installed. A narrower pipe in the roof that fits snugly into a larger segment of the building can also be used. The threat of water seepage, condensation, and poor indoor air quality can all be overcome with proper waterproofing and ventilation.

==== Limited natural light ====
Despite large windows (usually facing south in the Northern Hemisphere), many earth-sheltered homes have dark areas in the areas opposite the windows. All natural light coming from one side of the home can give a "tunnel or cave effect".

==== Risk of collapse ====
Reports of collapse seem to be rare. In one case, an author and proponent of earth sheltering died when an earth roof he designed collapsed on him.

==== Limited escape routes ====
Compared to above ground house, earth-shelters may have limited escape routes in case of emergency, which can fail egress and fenestration building codes.

==== Legal issues ====
An earth shelter may not be able to be adapted to existing local building codes, and may not legally be lived in.

== Examples ==
=== Australia ===
- Coober Pedy, South Australia. Mining town with many underground "dugouts".
- Lightning Ridge

=== Switzerland ===
- Lättenstrasse estate ("Earth Homes") in Dietikon, by Peter Vetsch.

=== United Kingdom ===
- Underhill, Holme, West Yorkshire. The first modern earth sheltered building in the UK.
- Hockerton Housing Project, a community of 5 homes in Nottinghamshire, England.
- "The Burrow" in Canterbury, UK designed by Patrick Kennedy-Sanigar.
- There are 2 earthships in the UK, at Fife, Scotland and the Earthship Brighton in England.
- "The Underground House" in Great Ormside, Cumbria. Two storey earth shelter built in a disused quarry.
- Malator, Pembrokeshire. Built for former Labour MP Bob Marshall-Andrews in 1998.
- Undermill, Bushey Heath Watford, Hertfordshire, Build 1996 modern earth sheltered building 4 bedroom 170m2 in the UK.

=== United States ===
- Bill Gates' house, on the shore of Lake Washington (Medina, Washington, USA). This is a well-known example of an earth-sheltered home.
- Forestiere Underground Gardens in Fresno, California.
- Underground House Colorado in Ward, Colorado, was a subterranean dwelling known for its architectural design.
- Underground House Las Vegas in Las Vegas is based on the designs of Jay Swayze.
- Underground World Home, was a home designed for the 1964 New York World's Fair by architect Jay Swayze.

== Gallery ==
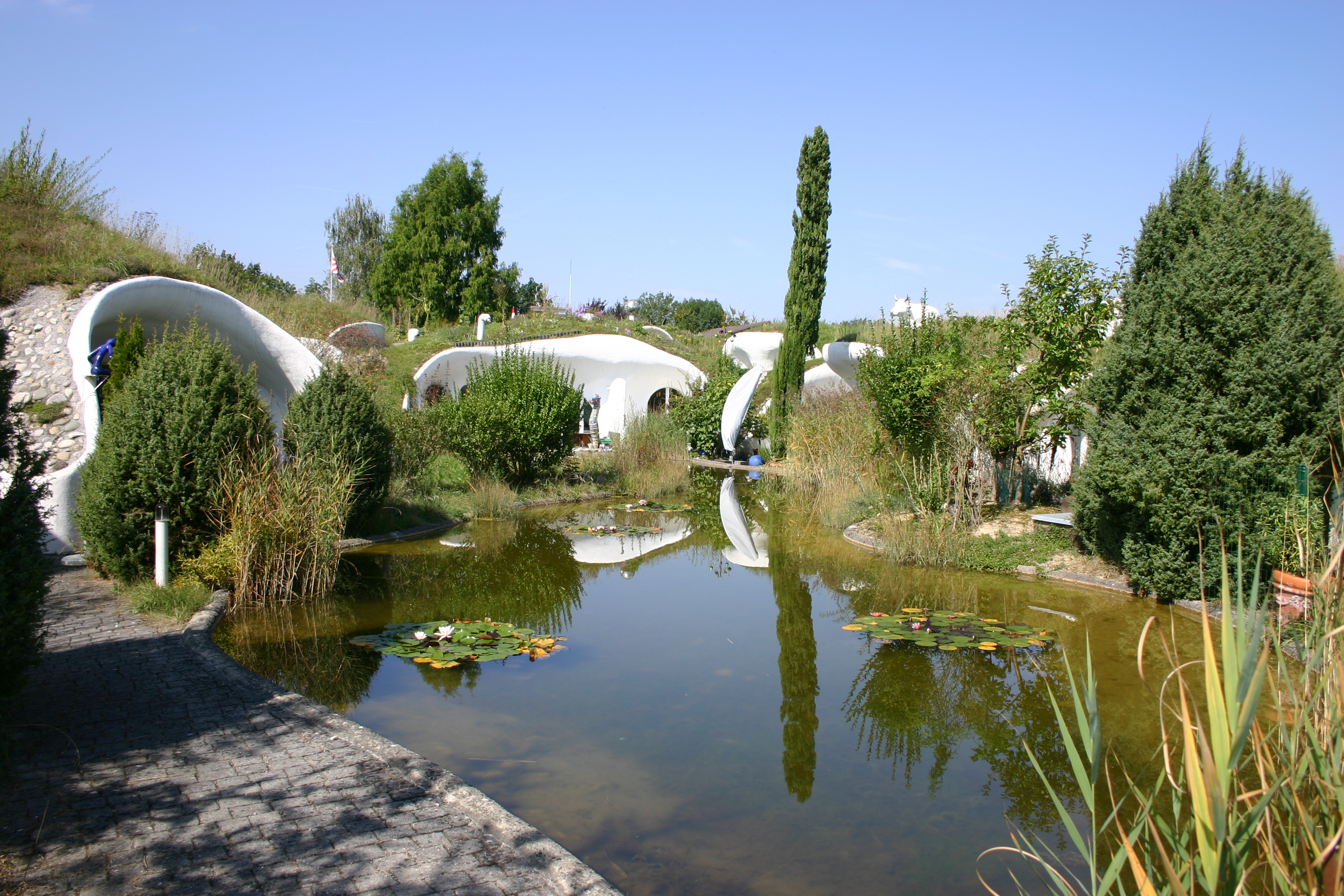
Earth house estate in Dietikon made by Peter Vetsch

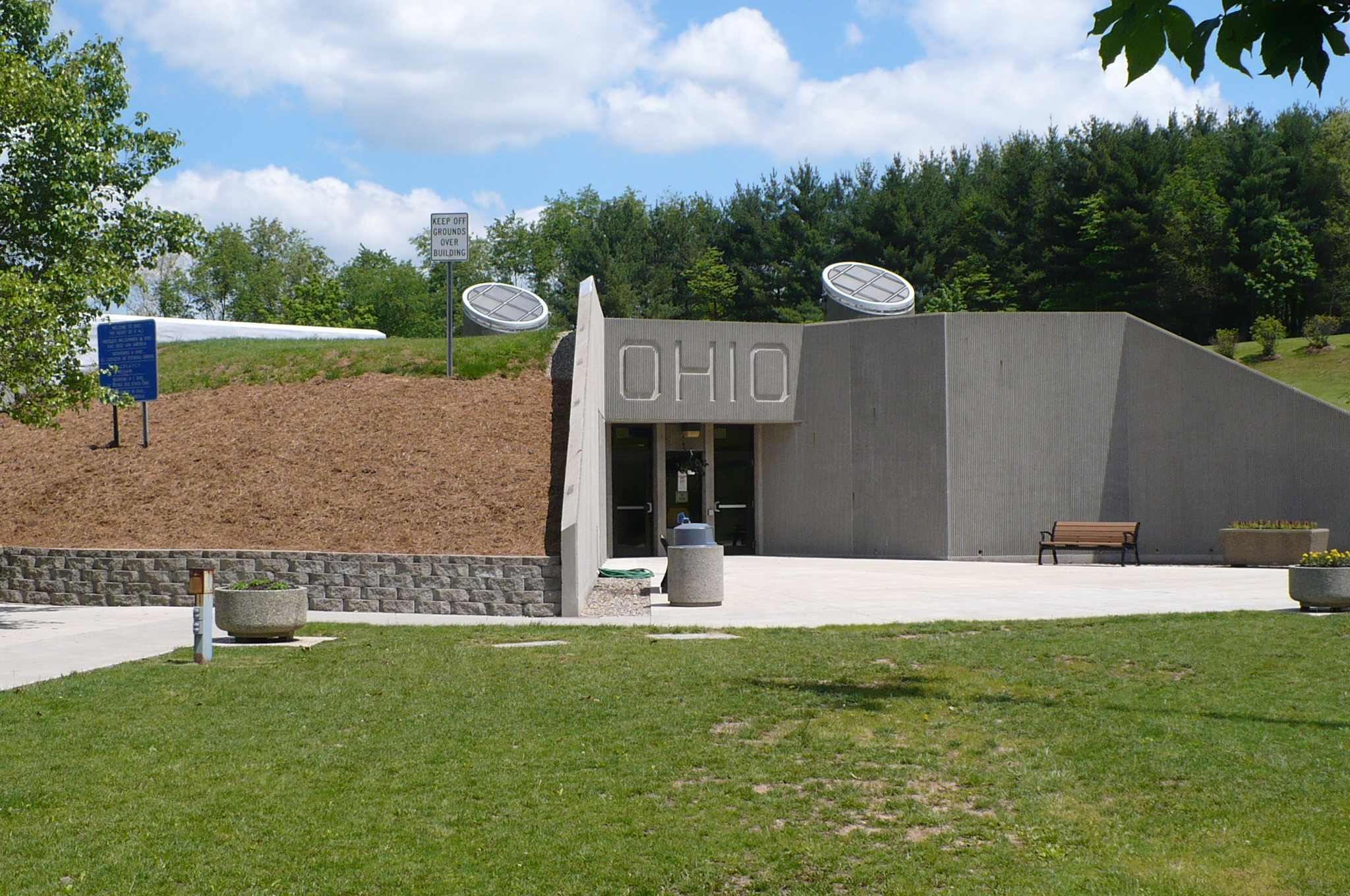
Earth Sheltered rest area along Interstate 77 in Ohio, USA

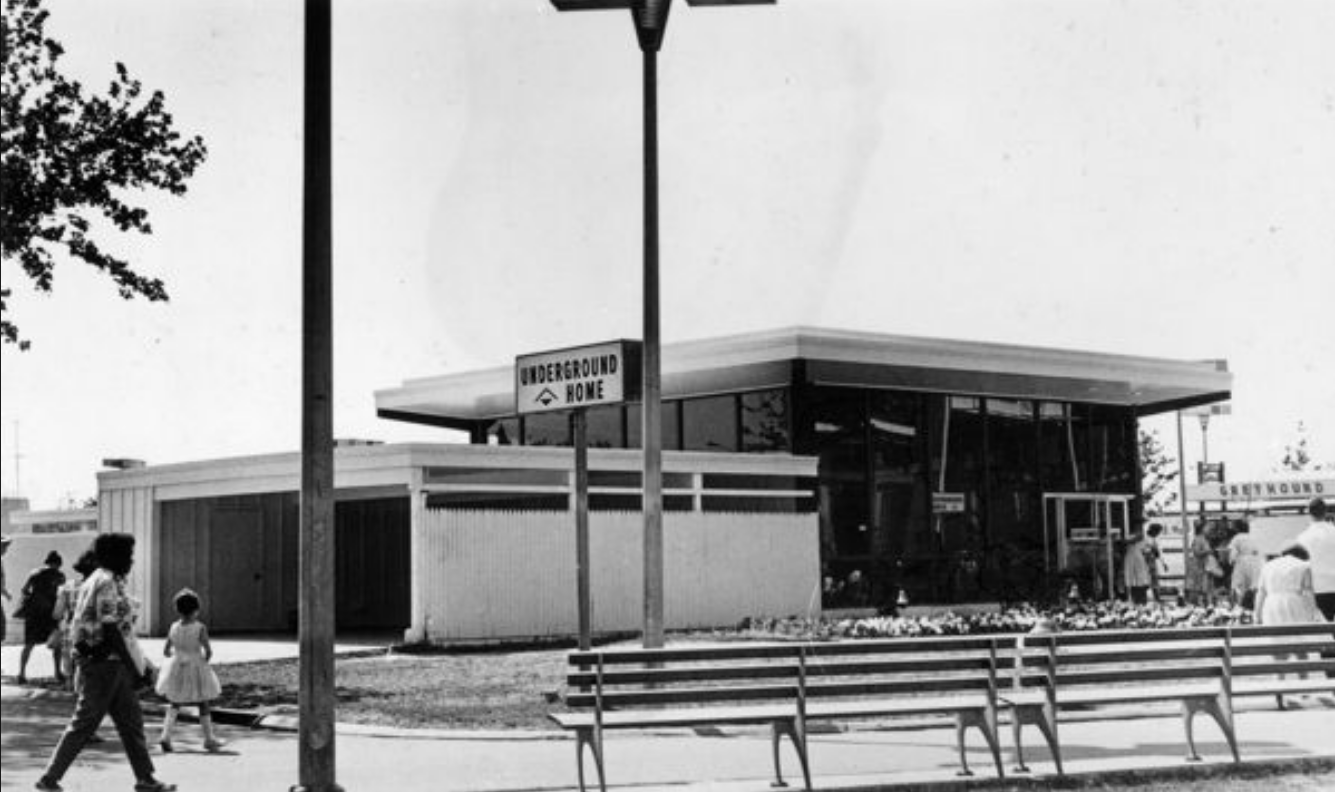
Underground World Home exhibit, New York

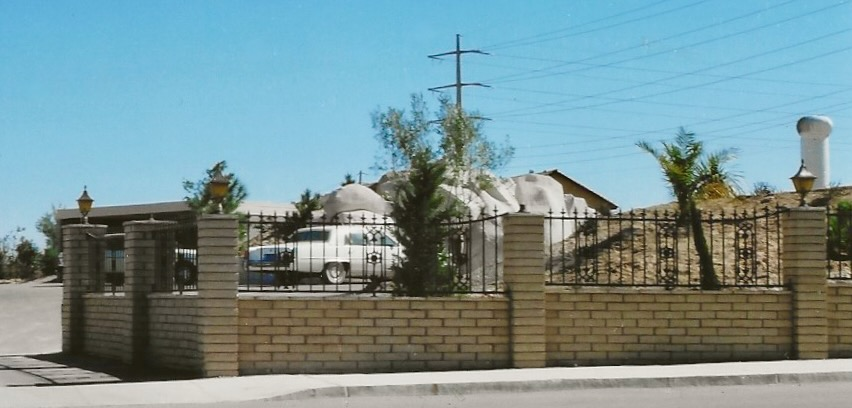
Underground House Las Vegas

== See also ==
Topics:

- Underground living

Types:

- Burdei
- Dugout
- Earth lodge
- Earthship
- Grubenhaus
- Kiva
- Pit-house
- Quiggly hole
- Rock-cut
- Shabestan
- Sod house
- Souterrain house
- Yaodong
- Zemlyanka

Applications:

- Daylight basement
- Earth cooling tubes
- Earthscraper
- Energy-efficient landscaping
- Energy conservation
- Green roof
- Hurricane-proof building
- Passive house
- Passive solar
- Radiation shielding
- Root cellar

Proponents:

- Cosanti—site of "Earth House" designed by architect Paolo Soleri
- Earl Young (architect)—works commonly referred to as gnome homes, mushroom houses, or Hobbit houses
- Michael E. Reynolds—inventor of the Earthship
