= Heat detector =

Type of fire alarm

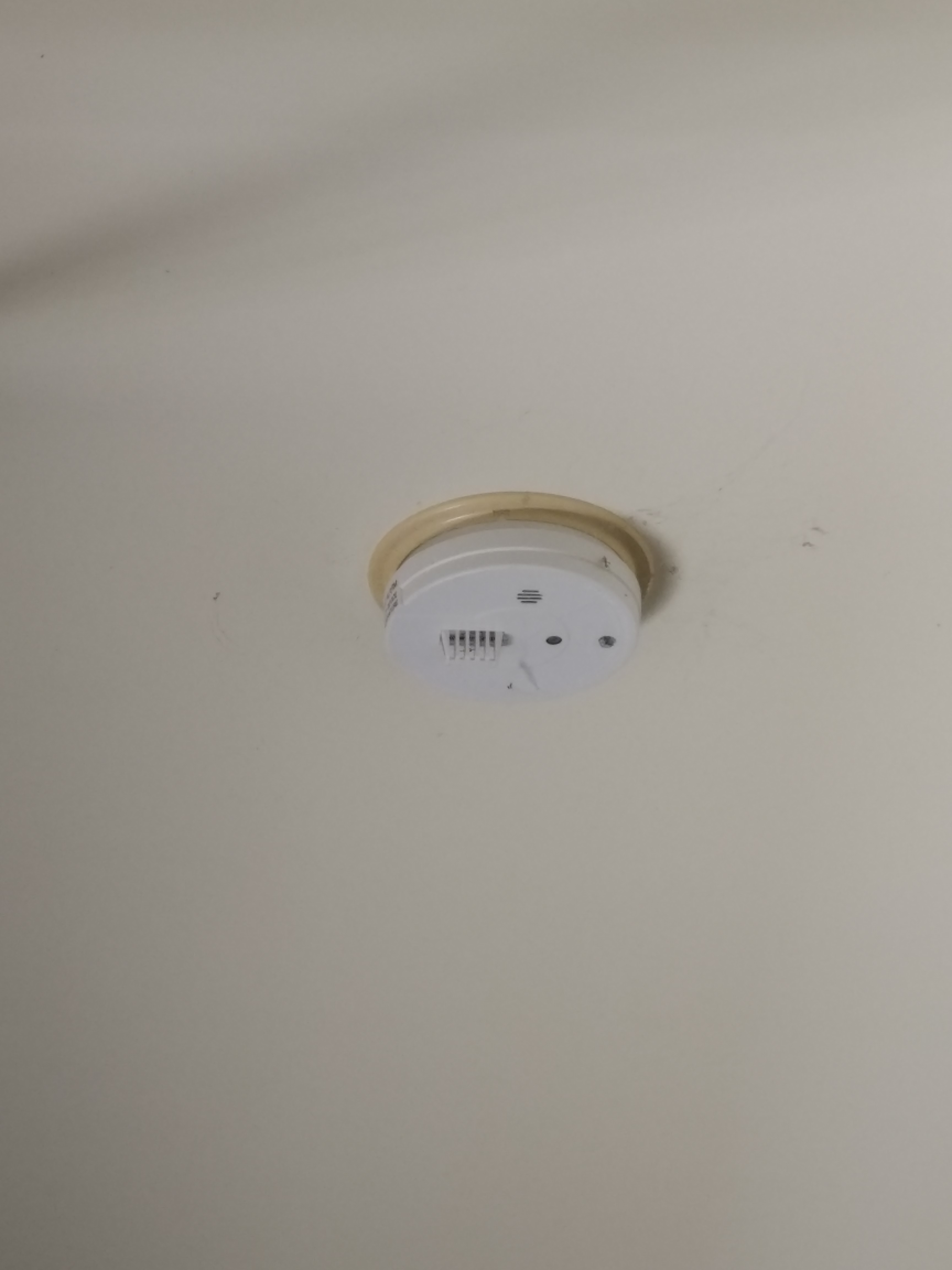
A residential heat detector

A heat detector is a fire alarm device designed to respond when the convected thermal energy of a fire increases the temperature of a heat sensitive element. The thermal mass and conductivity of the element regulate the rate flow of heat into the element. All heat detectors have this thermal lag. Heat detectors have two main classifications of operation, "rate-of-rise" and "fixed temperature". The heat detector is used to help in the reduction of property damage.

== Fixed temperature heat detectors ==
This is the most common type of heat detector. Fixed temperature detectors operate when the heat sensitive eutectic alloy reaches the eutectic point changing state from a solid to a liquid. Thermal lag delays the accumulation of heat at the sensitive element so that a fixed-temperature device will reach its operating temperature sometime after the surrounding air temperature exceeds that temperature. The most common fixed temperature point for electrically connected heat detectors is 58 °C (136 °F).

== Rate-of-rise heat detectors ==
Rate-of-Rise (ROR) heat detectors operate on a rapid rise in element temperature of 6.7 to 8.3°C (12.1 to 14.9°F) increase per minute, irrespective of the starting temperature. This type of heat detector can operate at a lower temperature fire condition than would be possible if the threshold were fixed. It has two heat-sensitive thermocouples or thermistors. One thermocouple monitors heat transferred by convection or radiation, while the other responds to ambient temperature. The detector responds when the first sensing element's temperature increases relative to the other.

Rate of rise detectors may not respond to low energy release rates of slowly developing fires. To detect slowly developing fires combination detectors add a fixed temperature element that will ultimately respond when the fixed temperature element reaches the design threshold.

== Heat detector selection ==
Heat detectors commonly have a label on them that reads 'Not a life safety device'. This is because heat detectors are designed to respond to elevated temperatures, which may occur too late to safely alert individuals in the event of a fast-spreading fire. In contrast, smoke detectors are sensitive to the presence of smoke particles in the air, providing earlier warning of fire in many cases. Therefore, smoke detectors are more suitable for bedrooms or in hallways outside of bedrooms where early warning is crucial for life safety.

However, heat detectors are useful for areas like the kitchen, utility rooms (e.g., laundry room), garage, or attic, where smoke detectors may not be practical. In these areas, activities like cooking or the presence of dust and other particles could cause a smoke detector to trigger false alarms. A heat detector will provide a warning of a fire in these specific areas without being affected by non-fire related activities or particles. This allows extra time to evacuate the building or to put out the fire, if possible.

Mechanical heat detectors are independent fire warning stations that—unlike smoke detectors—can be installed in any area of a home. Portability, ease of installation, and excellent performance and reliability make this a good choice for residential fire protection when combined with the required smoke detectors. Because the detectors are not interconnected, heat activation identifies the location of the fire, facilitating evacuation from the home.

== Types ==
Each type of heat detector has its own set of advantages and limitations, making it important to select the appropriate device based on the specific requirements of the area being monitored.

=== Fixed threshold detector ===
A fixed threshold detector triggers an alarm when a specific temp threshold is reached or exceeded. This type of detector is generally less sensitive to rapid temperature fluctuations, making it more suitable for areas like large, industrial kitchens where ovens or other heat-producing equipment are frequently in use.

If a fixed threshold detector is placed above a large, closed oven, the detector is less likely to generate a nuisance alarm when the oven door is opened, releasing a transient heat surge. In this circumstance, the fixed threshold detector would be the preferable choice.

=== Rate-of-rise detector ===
A rate-of-rise detector, on the other hand, is designed to respond to a rapid increase in temperature over a short period of time. This type of detector is more sensitive to sudden temperature changes, making it better suited for areas that contain highly combustible materials.

If a room filled with highly combustible materials is protected by a fixed threshold detector, a rapidly-spreading fire could exceed the alarm threshold before the detector is triggered due to a phenomenon known as thermal lag refers to the delay that can occur in temperature measurements, which could cause a delay in triggering the alarm system. In this case, the rate-of-rise detector may be the preferred choice, as it would be more likely to detect rapid temperature increases and trigger an alarm in a timely manner.

== See also ==
- Aspirating smoke detector
- Automatic fire suppression
- Carbon monoxide detector
- Fire alarm system
- Fire sprinkler
- Flame detector
- Gaseous fire suppression
- Manual fire alarm activation
- Passive infrared sensor
- Smoke detector
