= Holme, West Yorkshire =

Village in West Yorkshire, England

Coordinates: 53.550°N 1.838°W

Holme
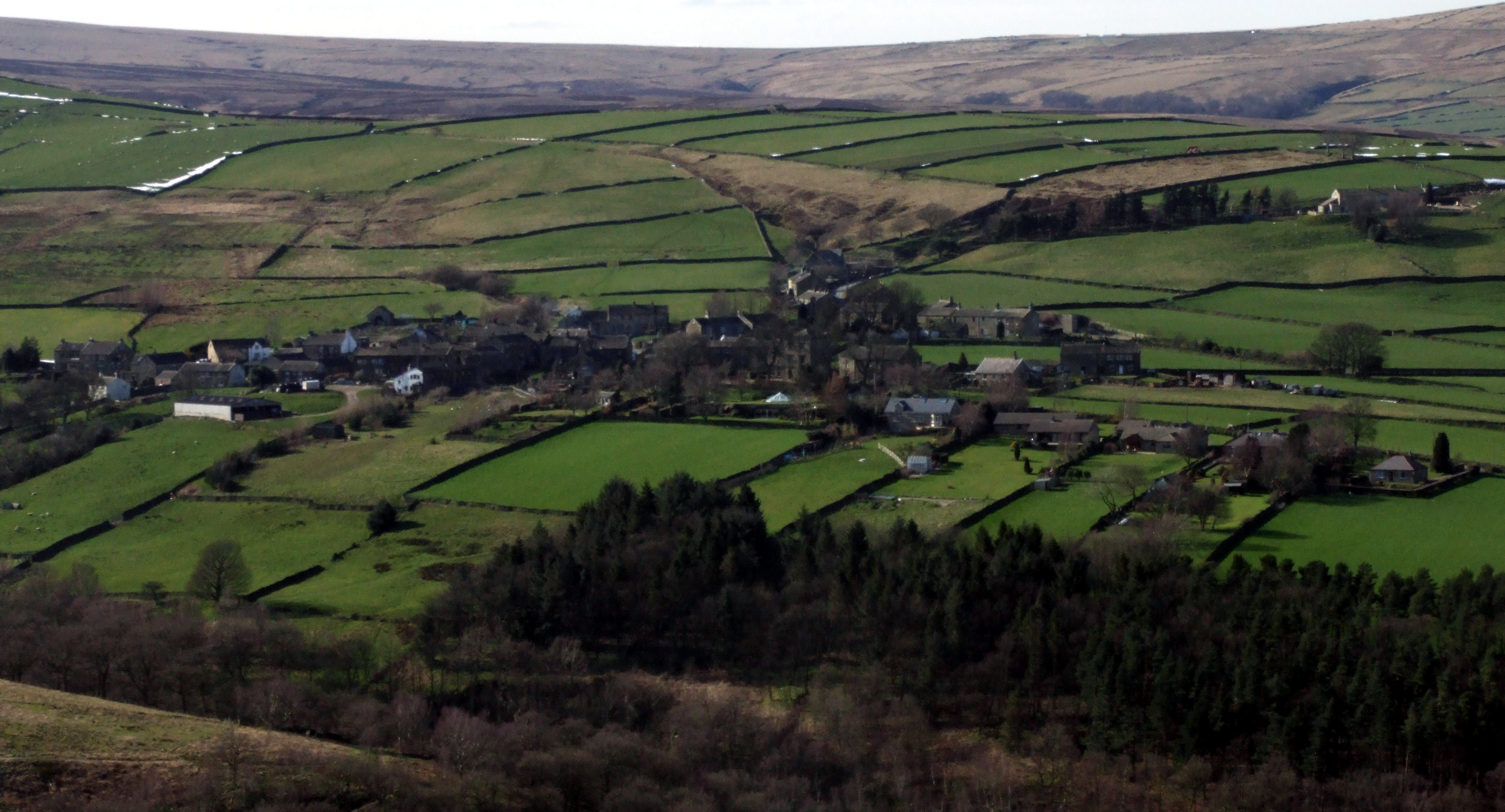
- Holme, viewed from Ramsden Road

- Location within West Yorkshire
- OS grid reference: SE108059
- Civil parish: Holme Valley
- Metropolitan borough: Kirklees
- Metropolitan county: West Yorkshire
- Region: Yorkshire and the Humber
- Country: England
- Sovereign state: United Kingdom
- Post town: Holmfirth
- Postcode district: HD9
- Dialling code: 01484
- Police: West Yorkshire
- Fire: West Yorkshire
- Ambulance: Yorkshire
- UK Parliament: Colne Valley

Holme is a village in the Holme Valley civil parish of Kirklees in West Yorkshire, England. The village straddles the A6024 road between Holmbridge and Lane village, 2.5 miles (4 km) south-west of Holmfirth. It is close to the boundaries of Derbyshire and the Peak District National Park: some properties lie outside of the National Park. Holme Moss, an area of high moorland with a prominent transmitter mast, overlooks the village from the south-west.

== History ==
Unlike many British places called Holme, the name of Holme in West Yorkshire derives from Old English holegn ('holly').

On 6 July 2014, Stage 2 of the 2014 Tour de France from York to Sheffield, passed through the village.

=== School ===
The schoolroom was built in 1694 with interest earned from money bequeathed by Joshua Earnshaw (£300) in 1693 and on land given by James Earnshaw, which is recorded in a document entitled Township of Holme – Earnshaw's Charity. Having become dilapidated, it was rebuilt in 1820 and again in 1838 when a schoolmaster's house was added at a cost of £680. The schoolroom was closed in 1880 when education was conducted in other premises. The only remaining parts of the school are the sides of the lower storey doorway and its rough-hewn dated headstone. Holme's Board School on Pinfold Street, now known as Meal Hill Road, had 99 pupils in 1900 falling to 11 at its lowest point, but the school survived and is flourishing today. The original Holme School building near the centre of the village is a non-denominational place of worship.

The schoolmaster was paid from interest accrued annually on the £300 placed in the charity. The number of children varied from 30 to 40. Until the date of the Elementary Education Act 1891, the school fees of certain children attending the Board School in Holme were paid, but this was discontinued when education was made free, and the school governors then devoted the money to the formation of a school library, with annual payments for books made from the charity.

== Geography ==
Near the village, on the moorland of Holme Moss, is the Holme Moss transmitting station; it is 526 metres (1,726 ft) above sea level and 200 metres (660 ft) tall. The Pennine Way passes south-west of the transmitter over Black Hill. The Peak District Boundary Walk passes through the village.

Water seeping from the surrounding moorland is the source of the River Holme which passes through the Holme Valley to Huddersfield, where it flows into the River Colne. The village is accessed by the A6024 Woodhead Road. It has a public house, the Fleece, and a school.

In 1822 Thomas Langdale recorded a population of 459 for the township of Holme. In 1931 the parish had a population of 368.

== Governance ==
Holme was a township in the parish of Holme-Bridge. From 1866 Holme was a civil parish in its own right, until on 1 April 1938 the parish was abolished and merged with Holmfirth; part also went to form Dunford.

== Gallery ==
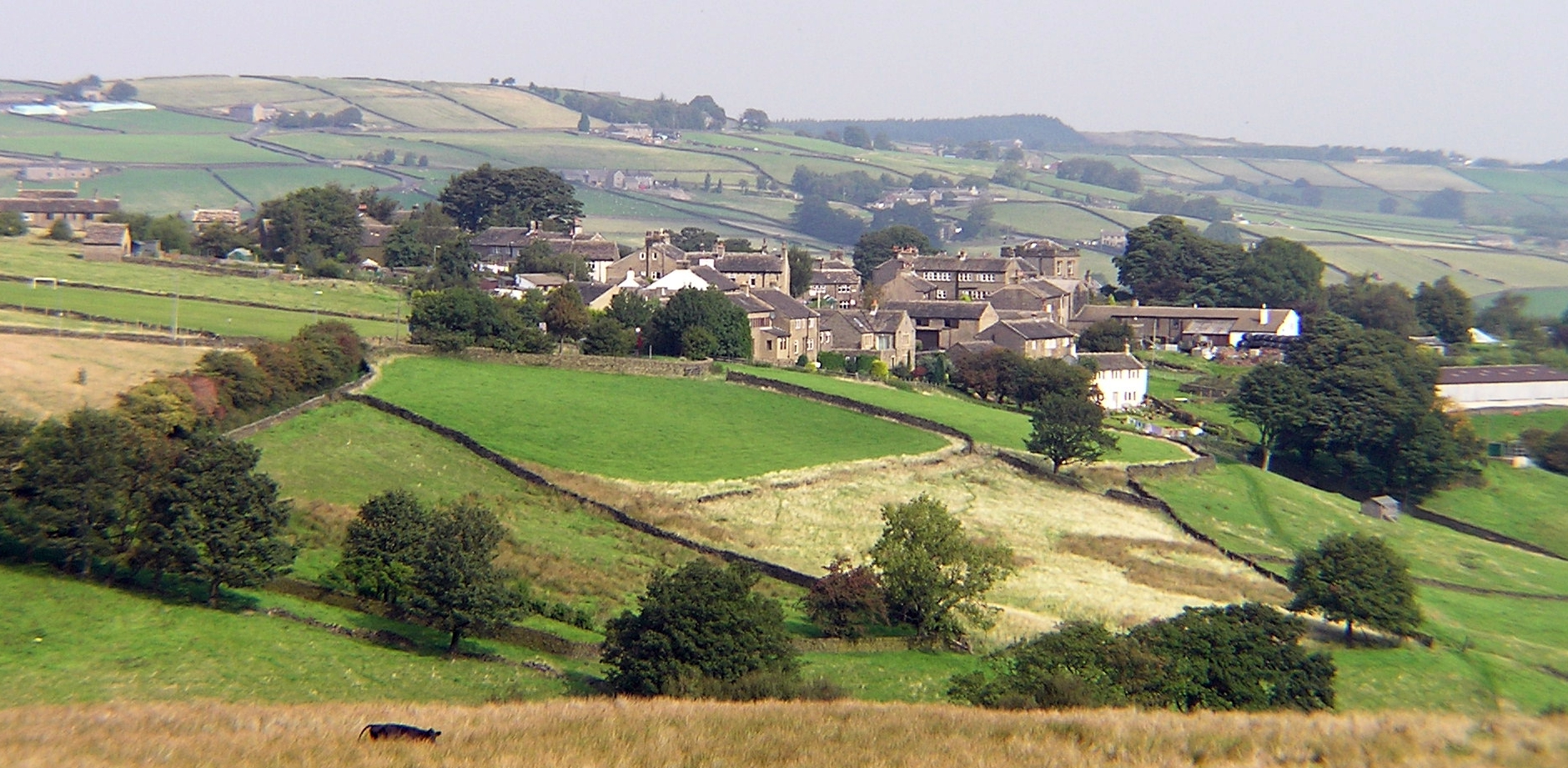
Holme, viewed from Rake Head Road

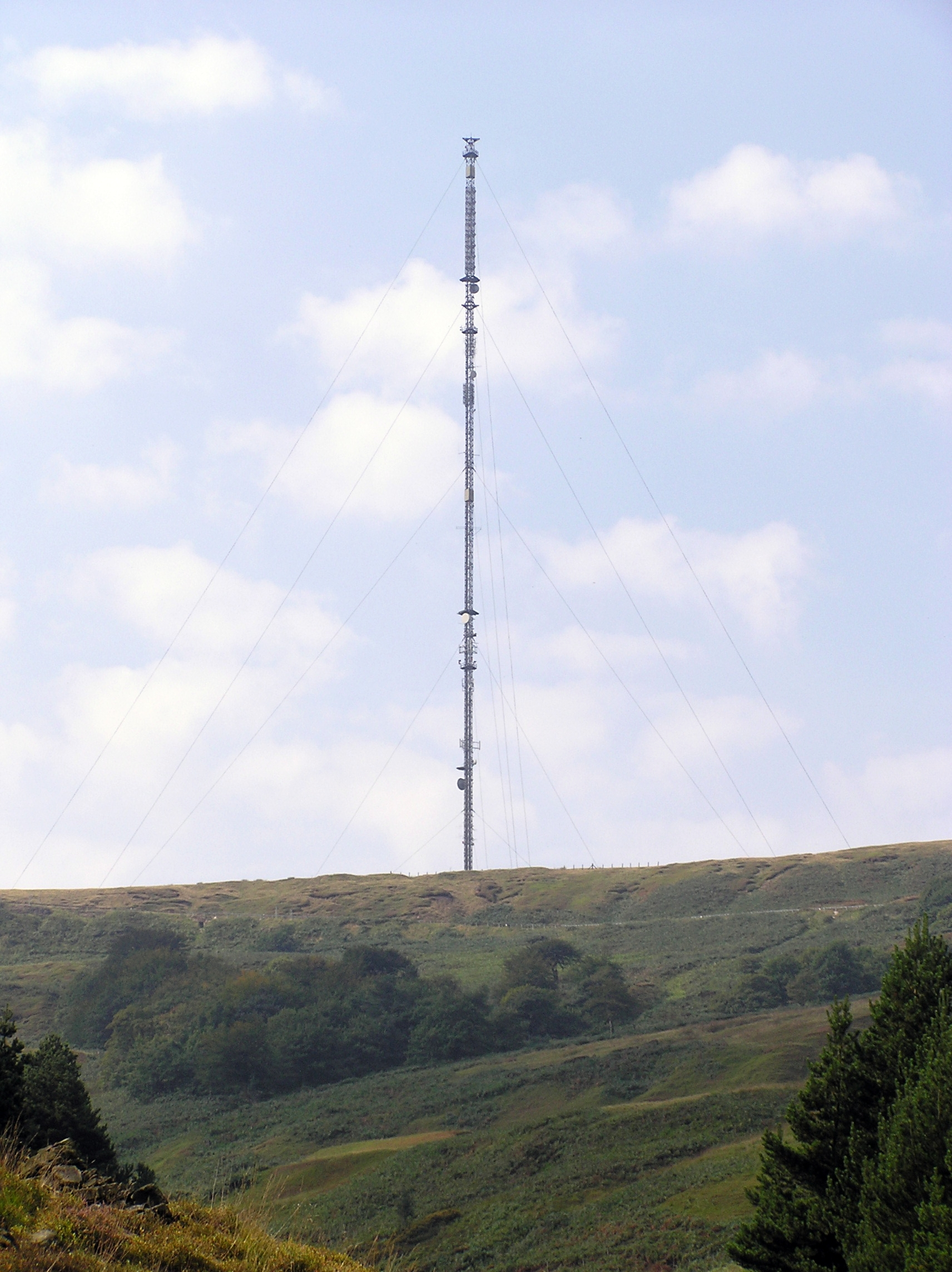
Holme Moss radio tower

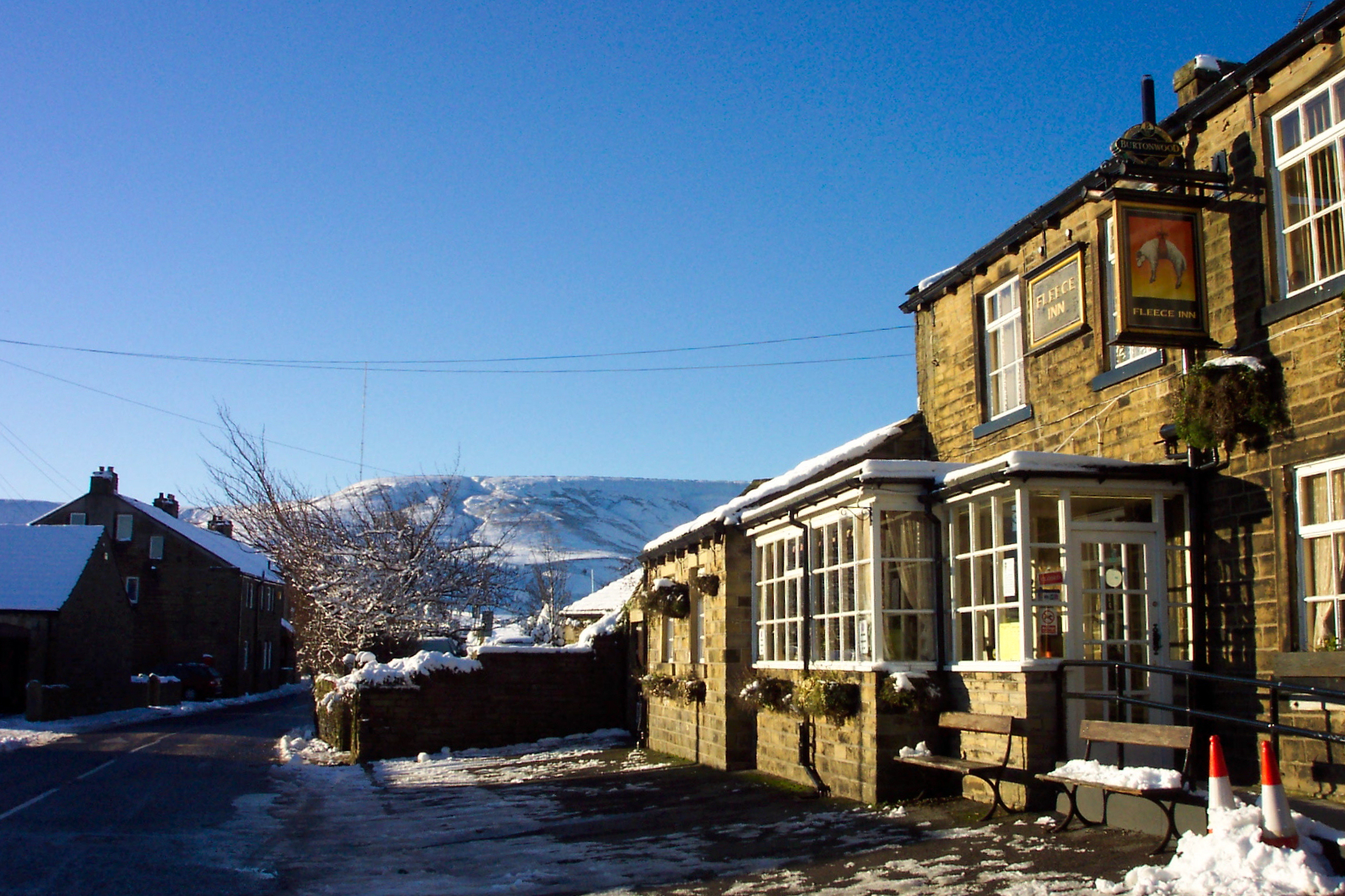
The Fleece at Holme with Holme Moss radio tower in background

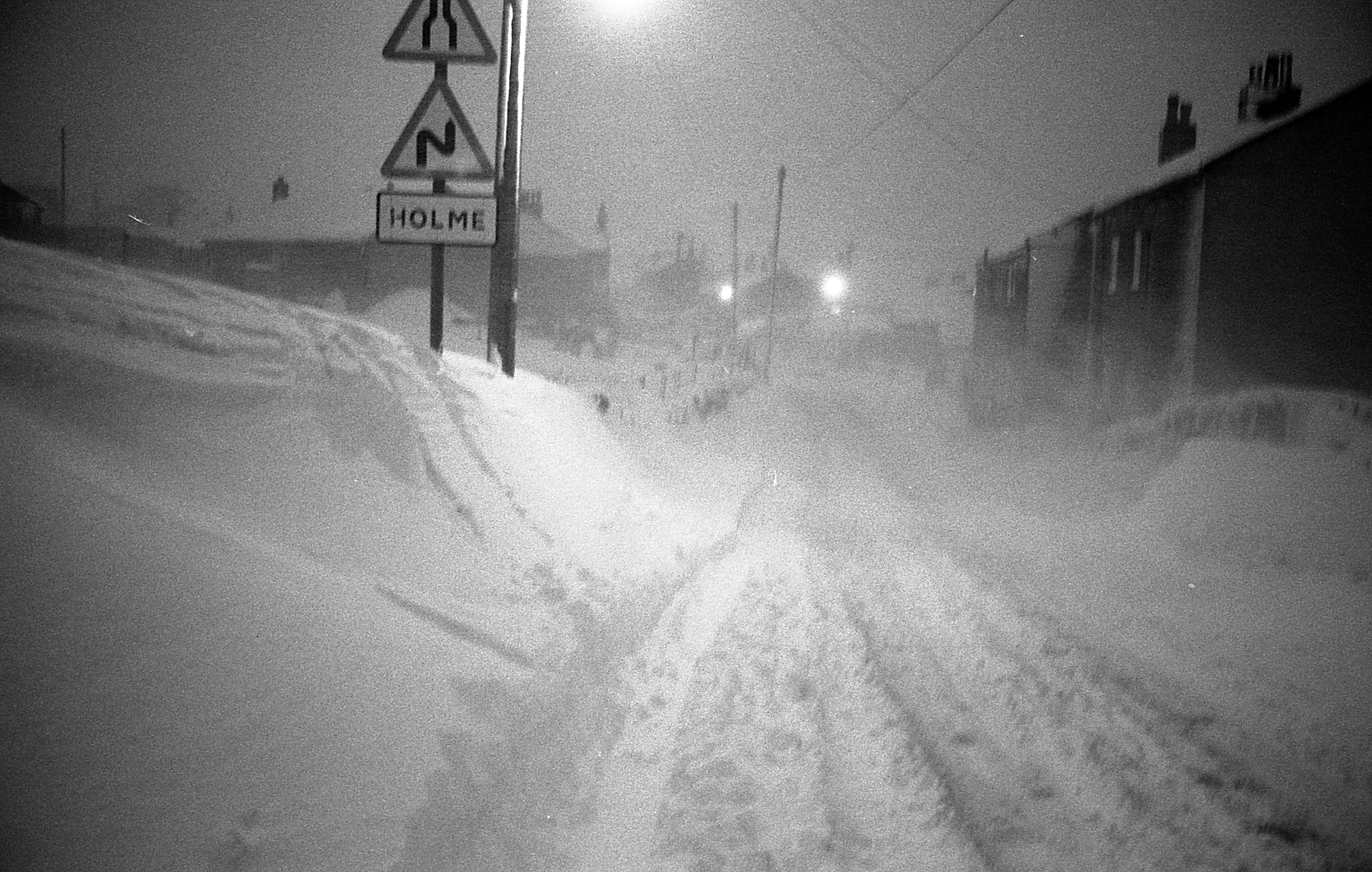
Holme village (winter 1978), viewed from the south-west

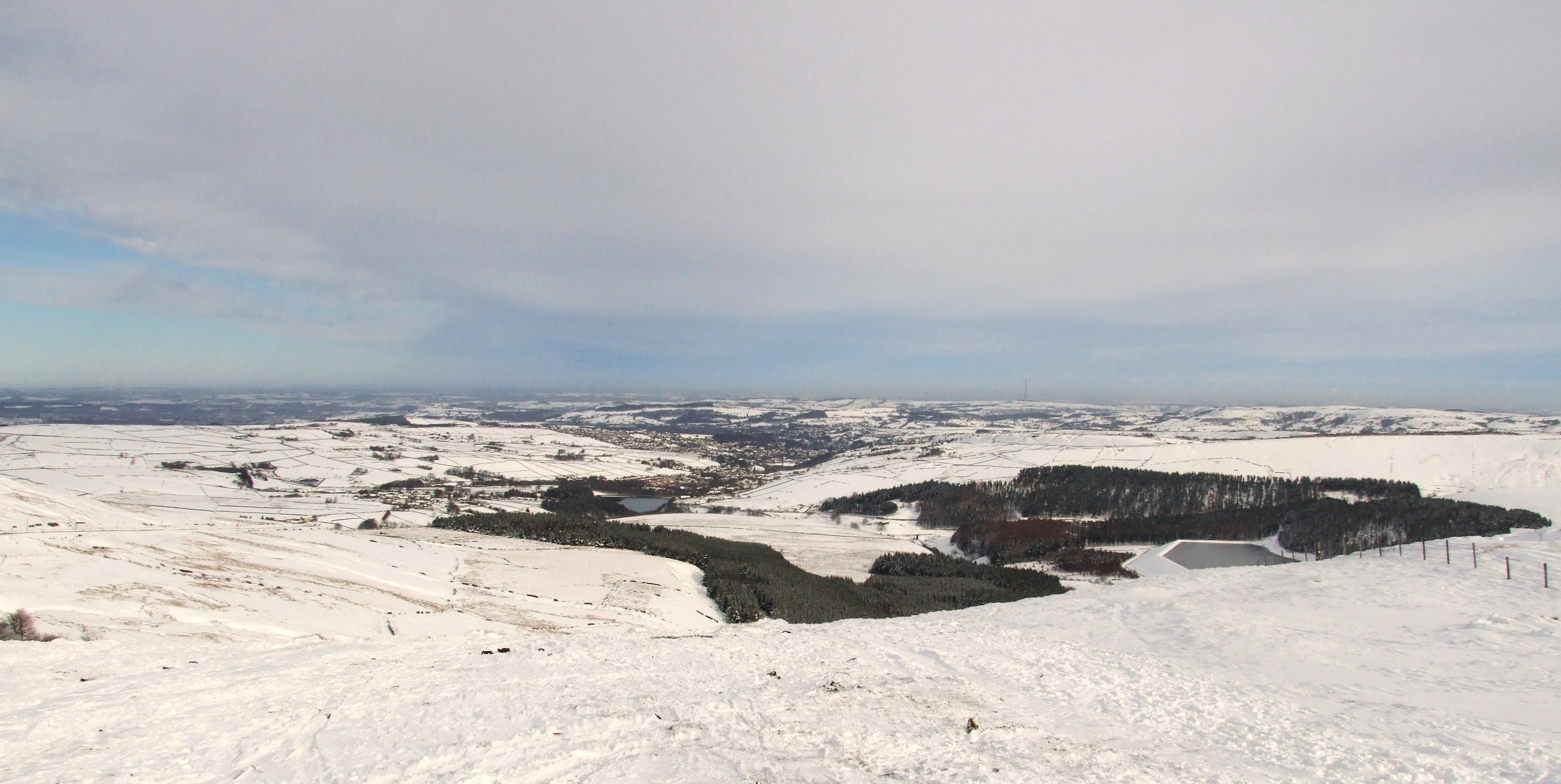
Holme village (February 2009) with Brownhill & Yateholme Reservoirs, viewed from Holme Moss, with Emley Moor TV Transmitter on the horizon. Just above Holme are Upperthong and Holmfirth.

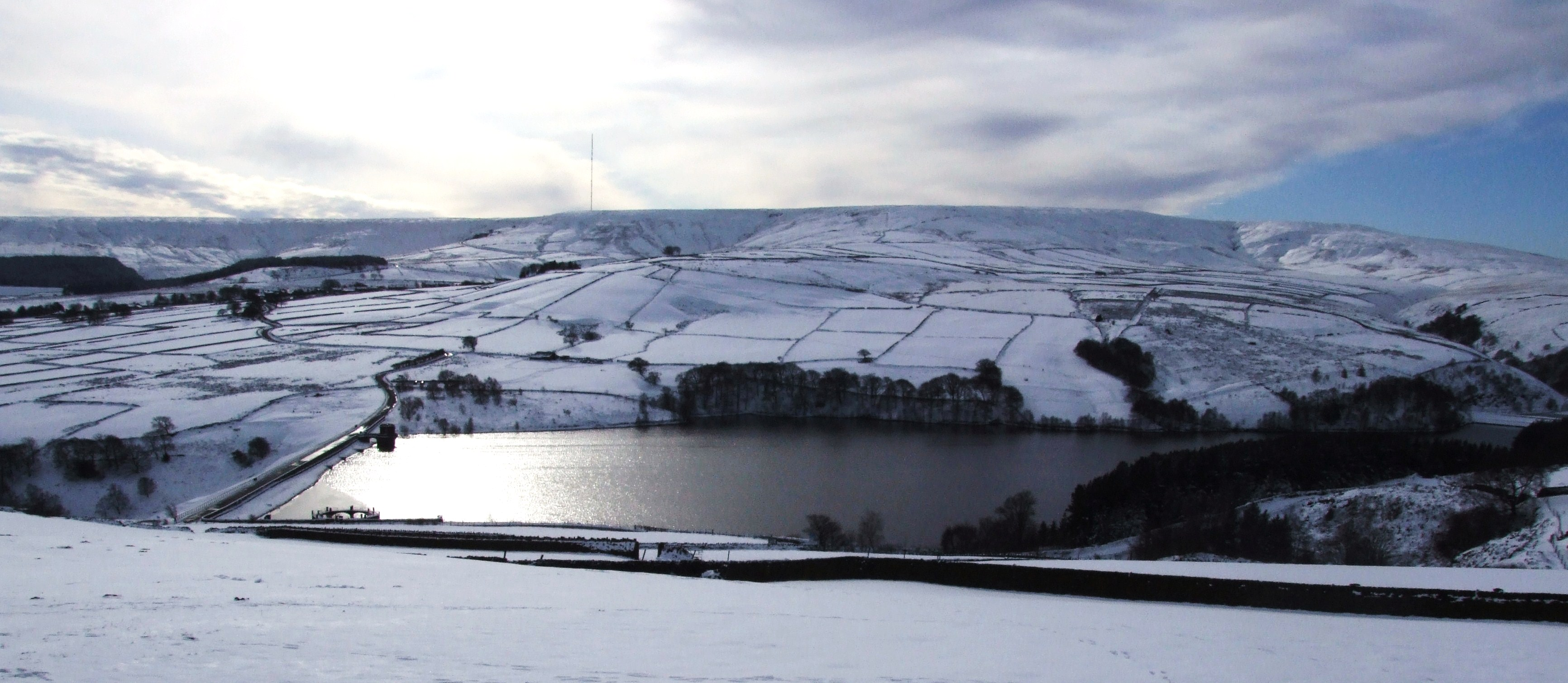
Holme Moss, above Digley Reservoir and Holme Village (February 2009)

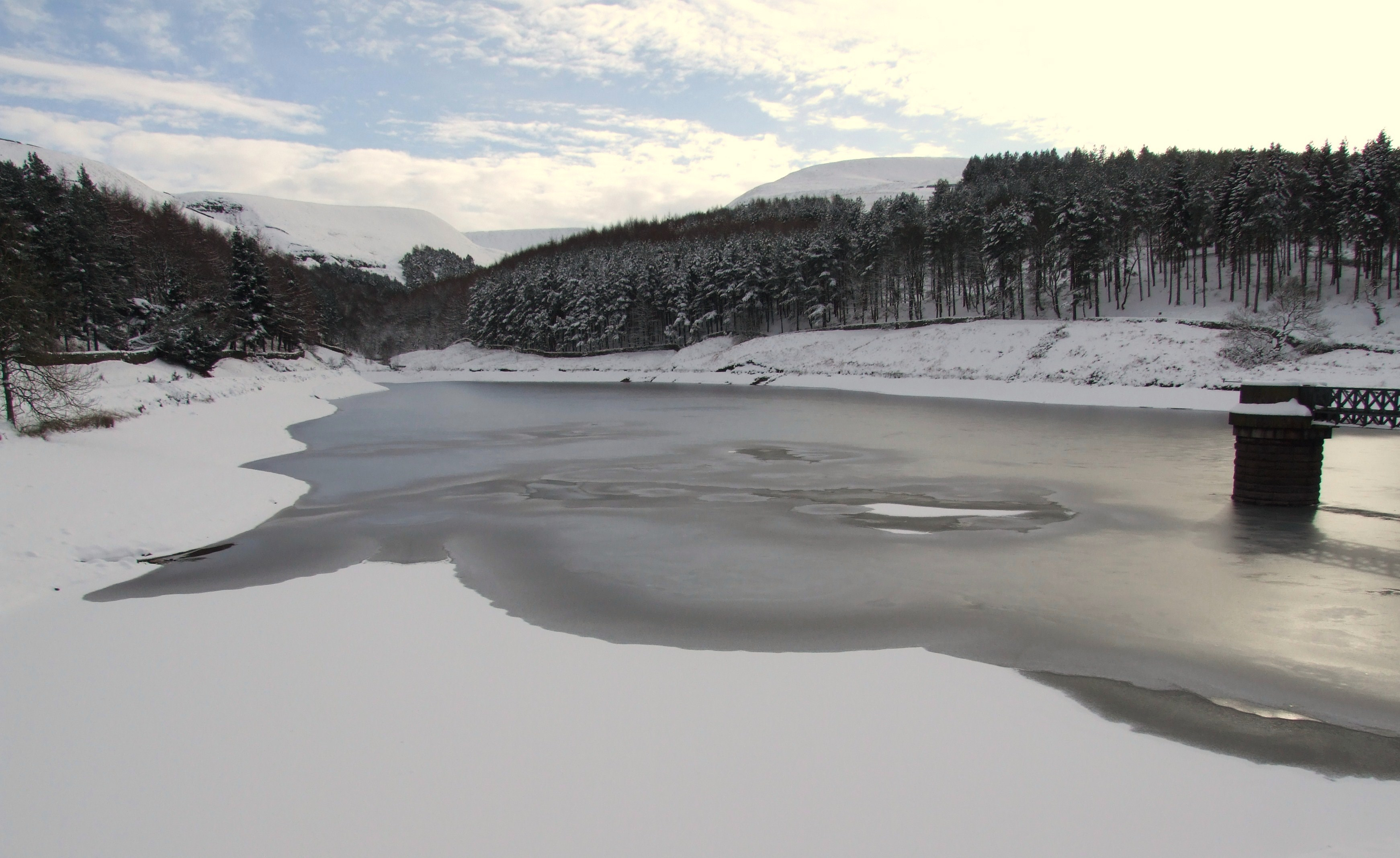
Riding Wood Reservoir (February 2009)

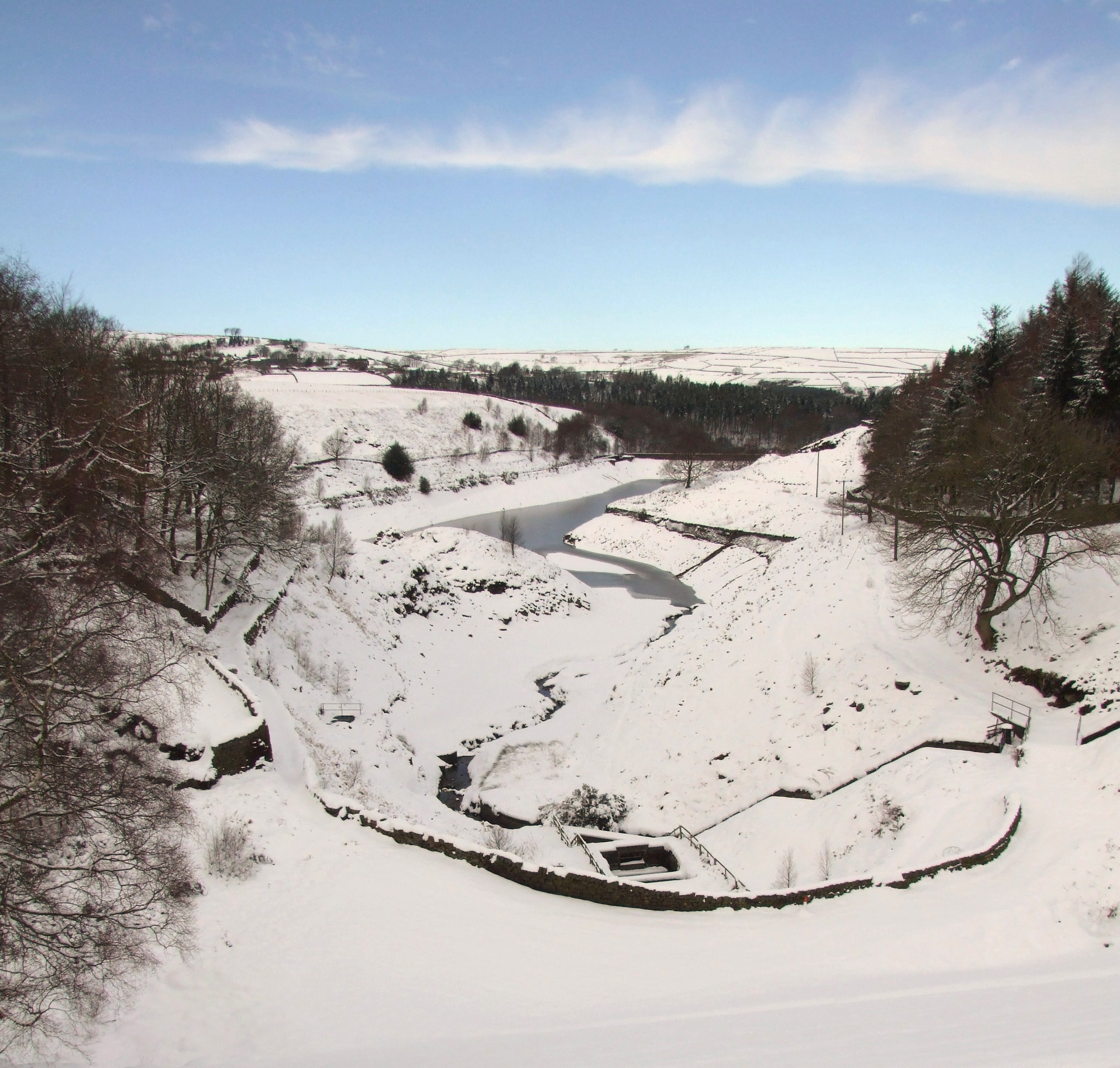
Ramsden Reservoir (February 2009)

== See also ==
- Underhill, Holme
