= Peter Vetsch =

Swiss architect (born 1943)

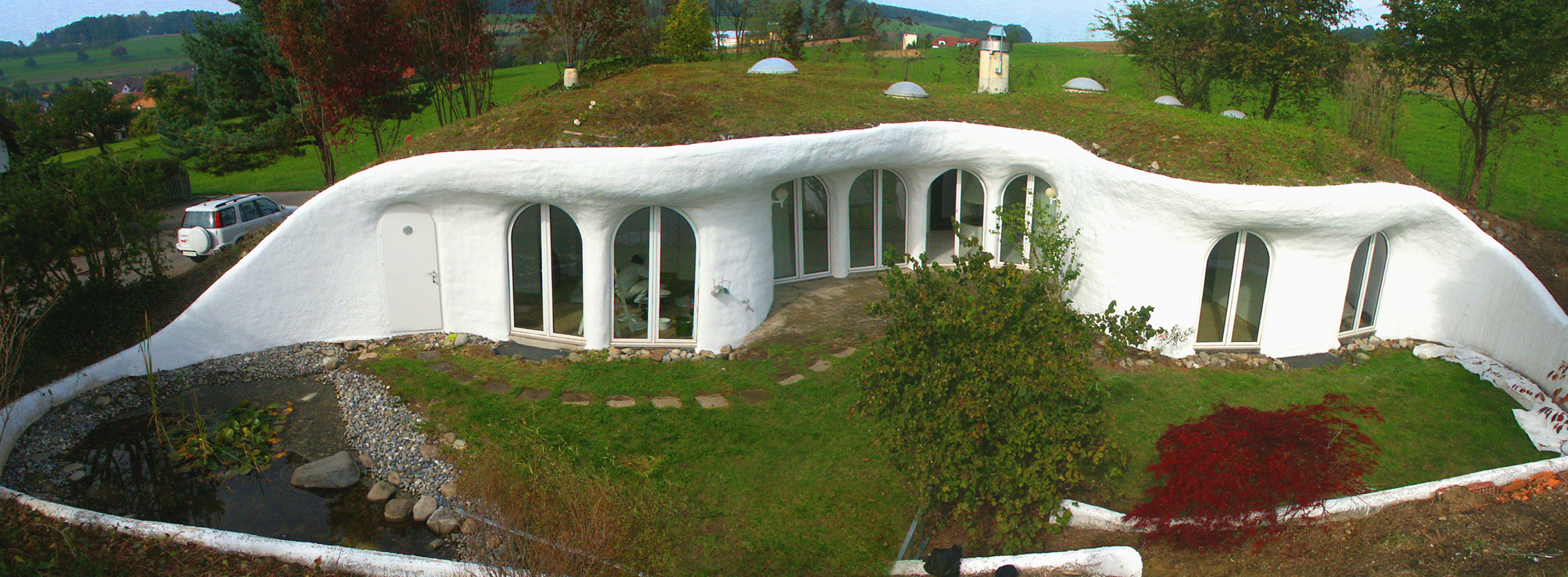
Earth house in Switzerland by Peter Vetsch

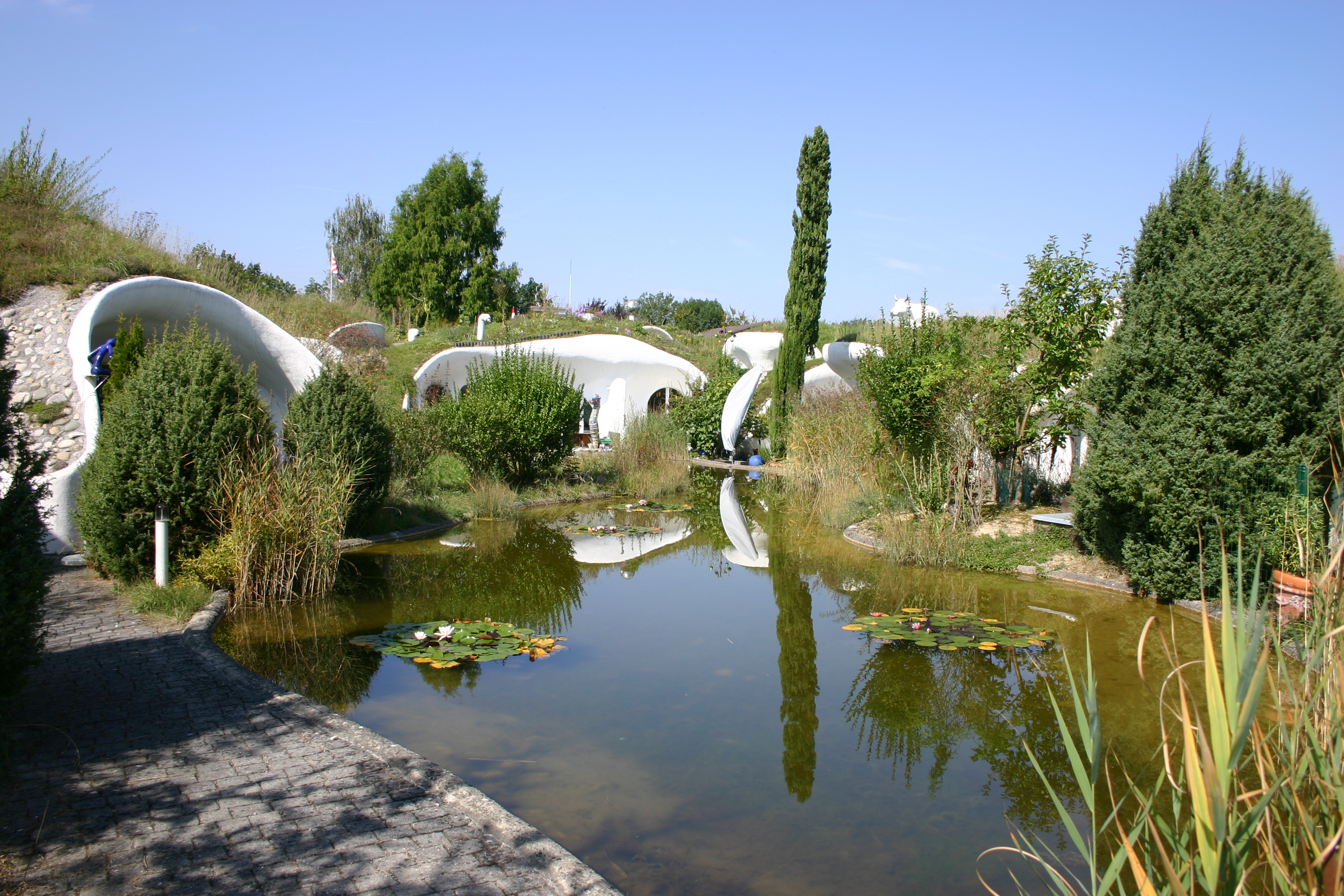
Earth house estate Lättenstrasse in Dietikon

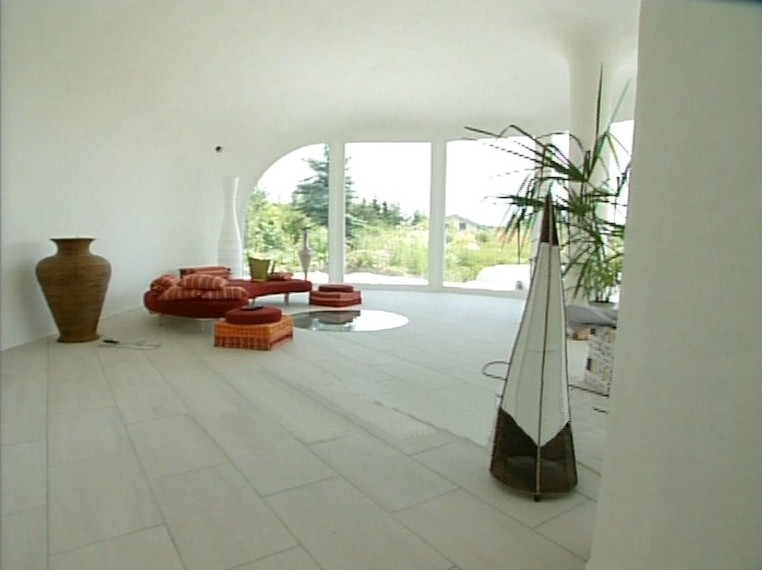
Interior of an earth house by Peter Vetsch

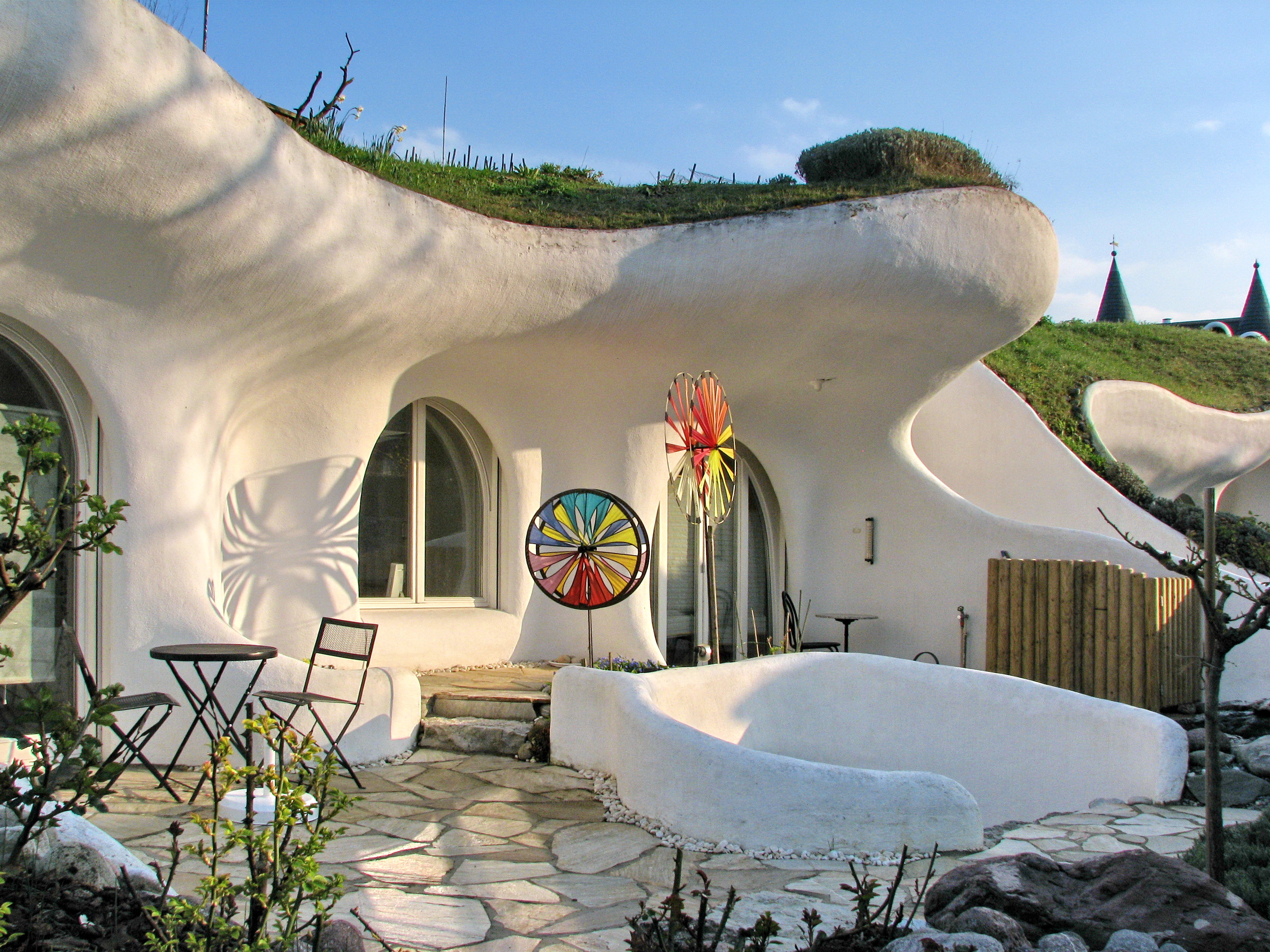
Lättenstrasse in Dietikon

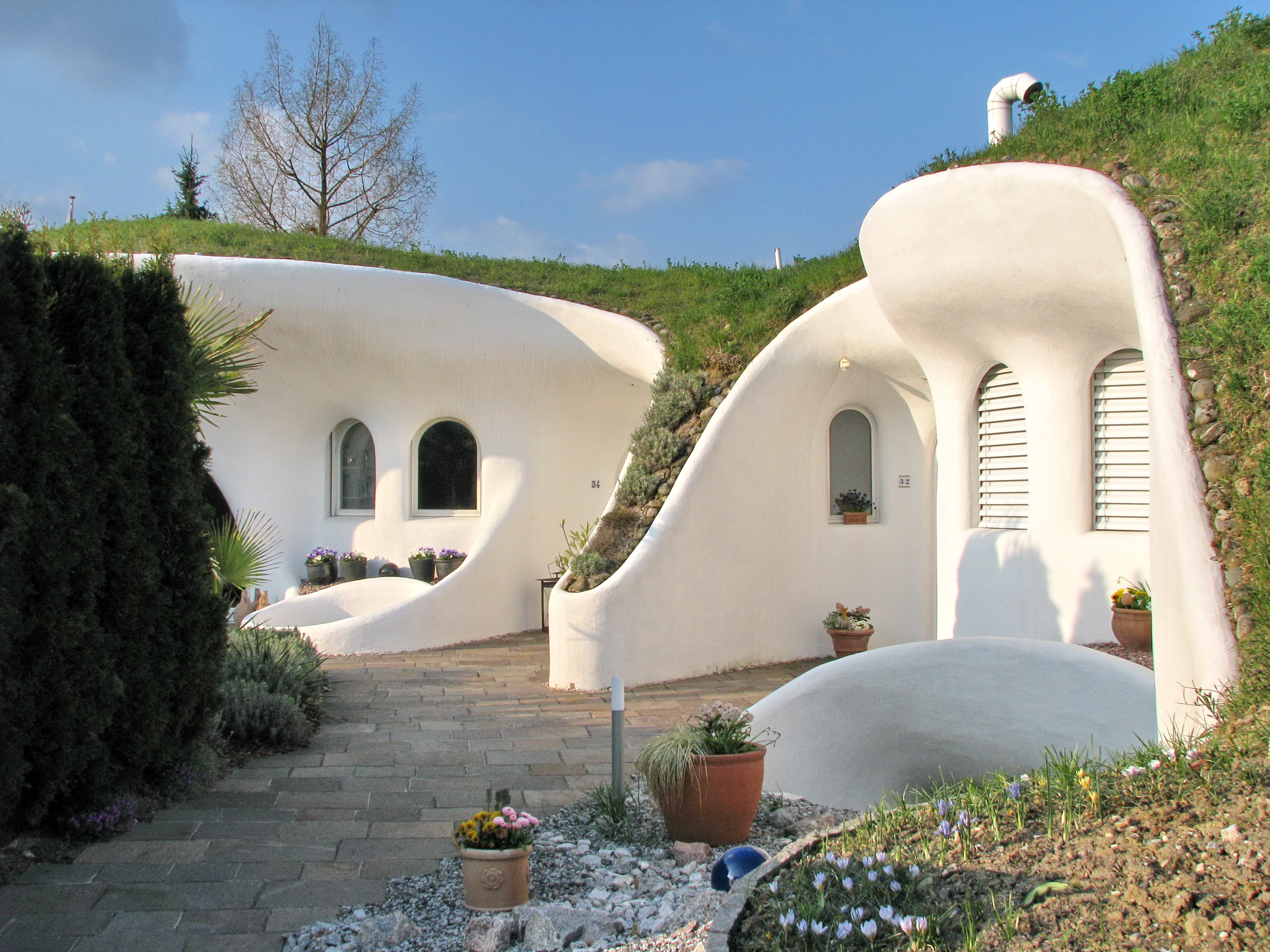
another view of the same building

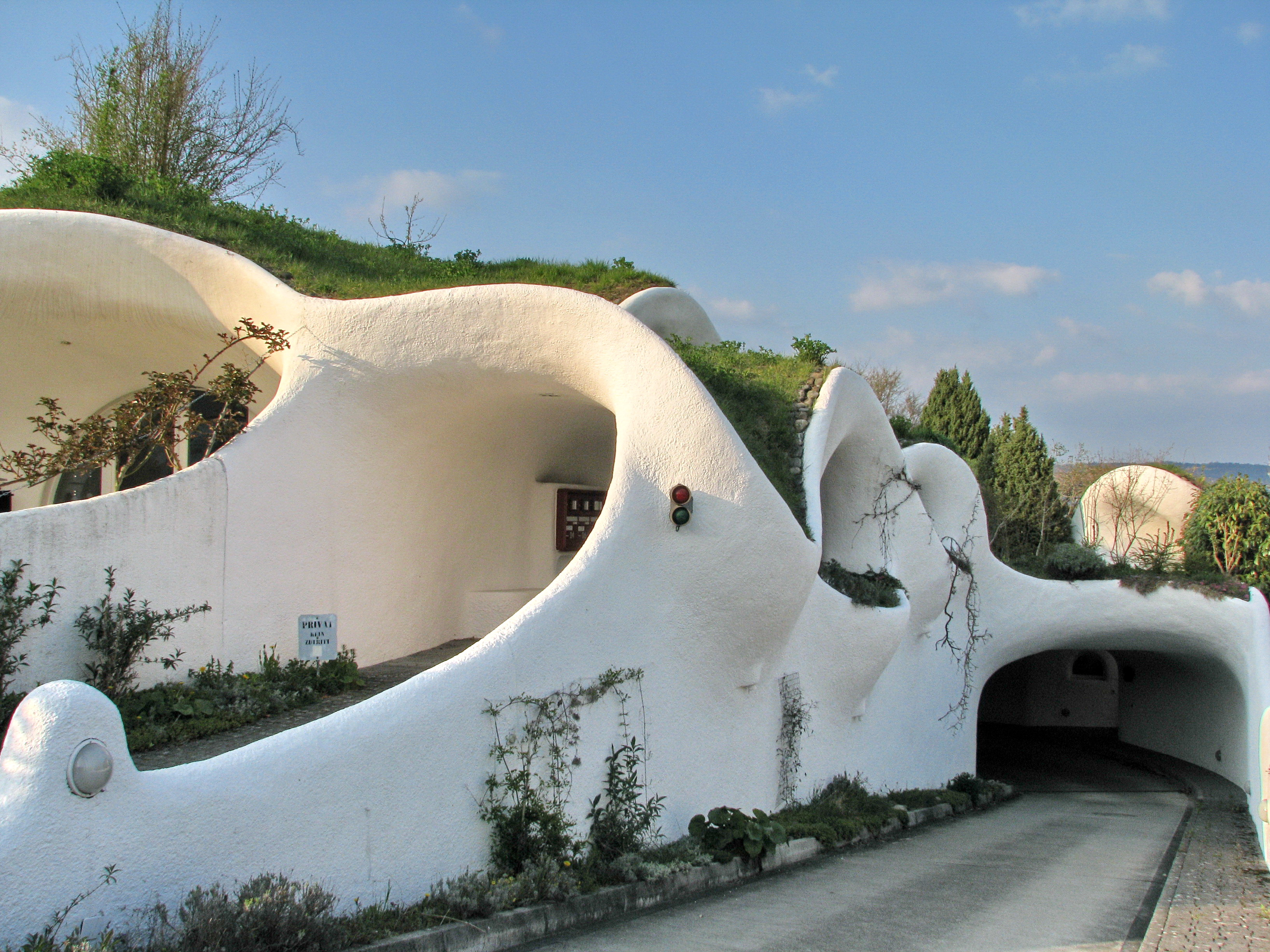
Parking facility

Peter Vetsch (born 14 March 1943) is a Swiss architect, known for building earth houses.

== Life ==
Vetsch was born 1943 in Sax, Switzerland. He attended public school in Sax from 1950 to 1956. He then attended an agricultural school in Cernier until 1962, where he graduated. Afterwards he was an apprentice in structural design in Winterthur and worked for an architecture office in St. Gallen. In the following years, Vetsch attended the academy of arts in Düsseldorf, Germany, where he graduated in 1970. After his diploma he worked for architecture offices in Germany and Switzerland.

== Occupational activity ==
Peter Vetsch has run his own architecture office in Dietikon, Switzerland since 1978.

Vetsch has built over 47 earth houses in Switzerland and around the world, and also a number of conventional houses. Vetsch’s Earth houses represent his conception of an environmentally conscious, ecological and progressive architecture.

Using sprayed concrete construction, he creates building shells which encompass maximum space with a minimum of surface area, reducing the energy needed for heating. These constructions eschew right angles, and their spatial diversity overcomes the monotony of traditional designs. They recall Antoni Gaudí's organic forms as well as Jugendstil architecture.

In 2011, Vetsch stepped down as the director of Artforum Berlin.

Vetsch was linked to designs for a series of Eco Theatres to be built in London's planned Olympic Park in time for London 2012.
