= Lane, West Yorkshire =

Hamlet in West Yorkshire, England

Coordinates: 53.555°N 1.803°W

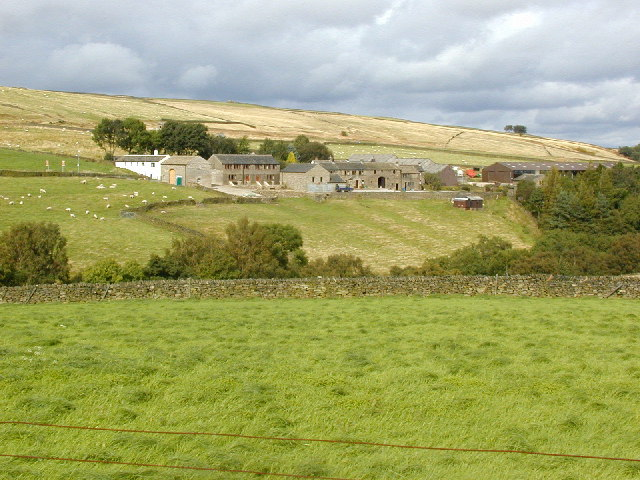
Lane Farm holiday cottages from Rake Head Road

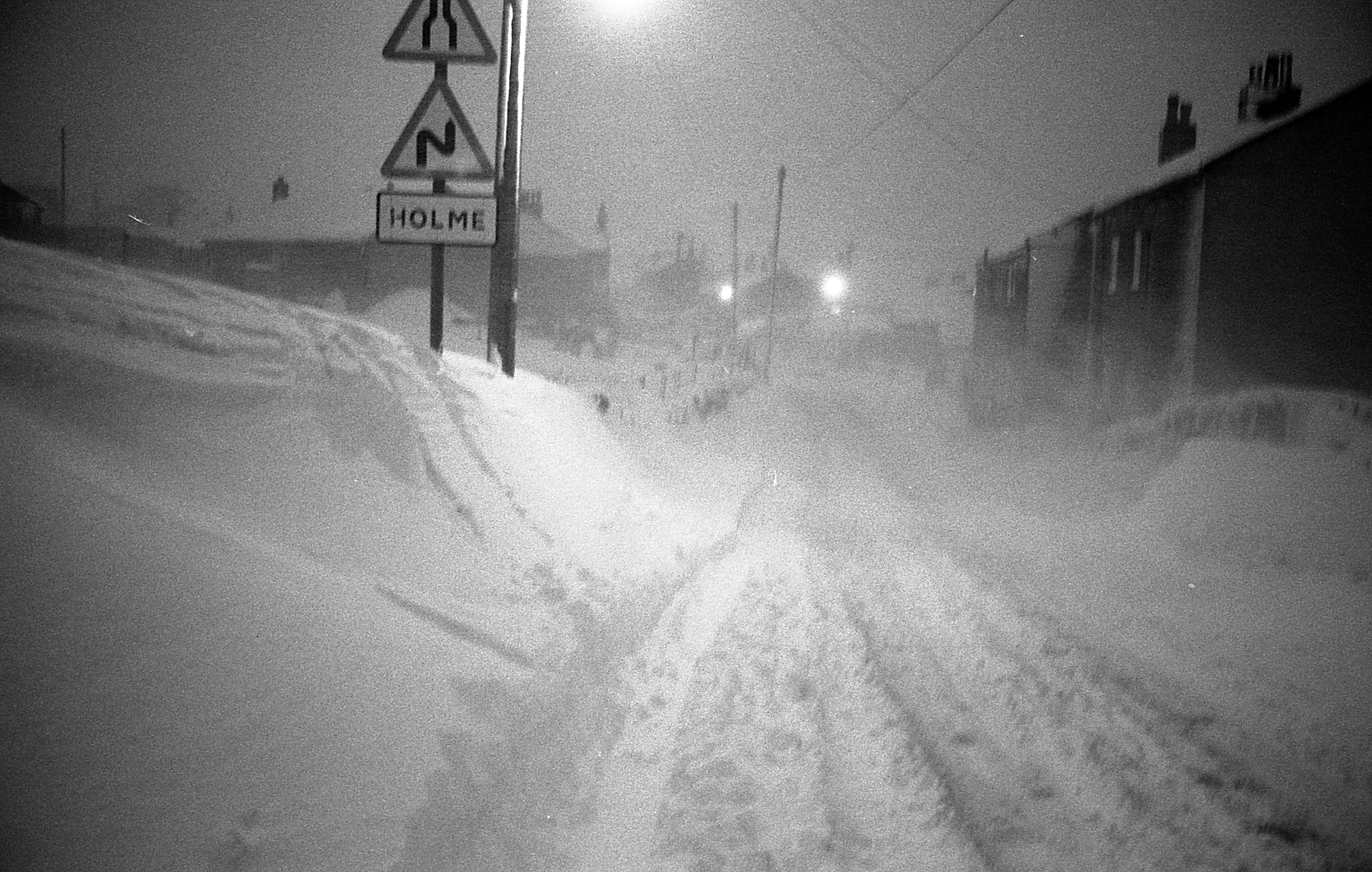
Road from Lane into Holme, during heavy snow in early 1978

Lane Village is a small hamlet 3 miles (4.8 km) southwest of Holmfirth and approximately half a mile southwest of Holme Village on the A6024 Woodhead Road. It lies on the edge of Holme Moss just inside the Peak District National Park boundary. The rainwater springs seeping from Holme Moss and Kaye Edge provide the source of the River Holme.

The village consists of farmhouses, holiday cottages and some private homes. It has long been associated with the Girl Guides Association by the addition of a small training centre, based in some refurbished buildings.

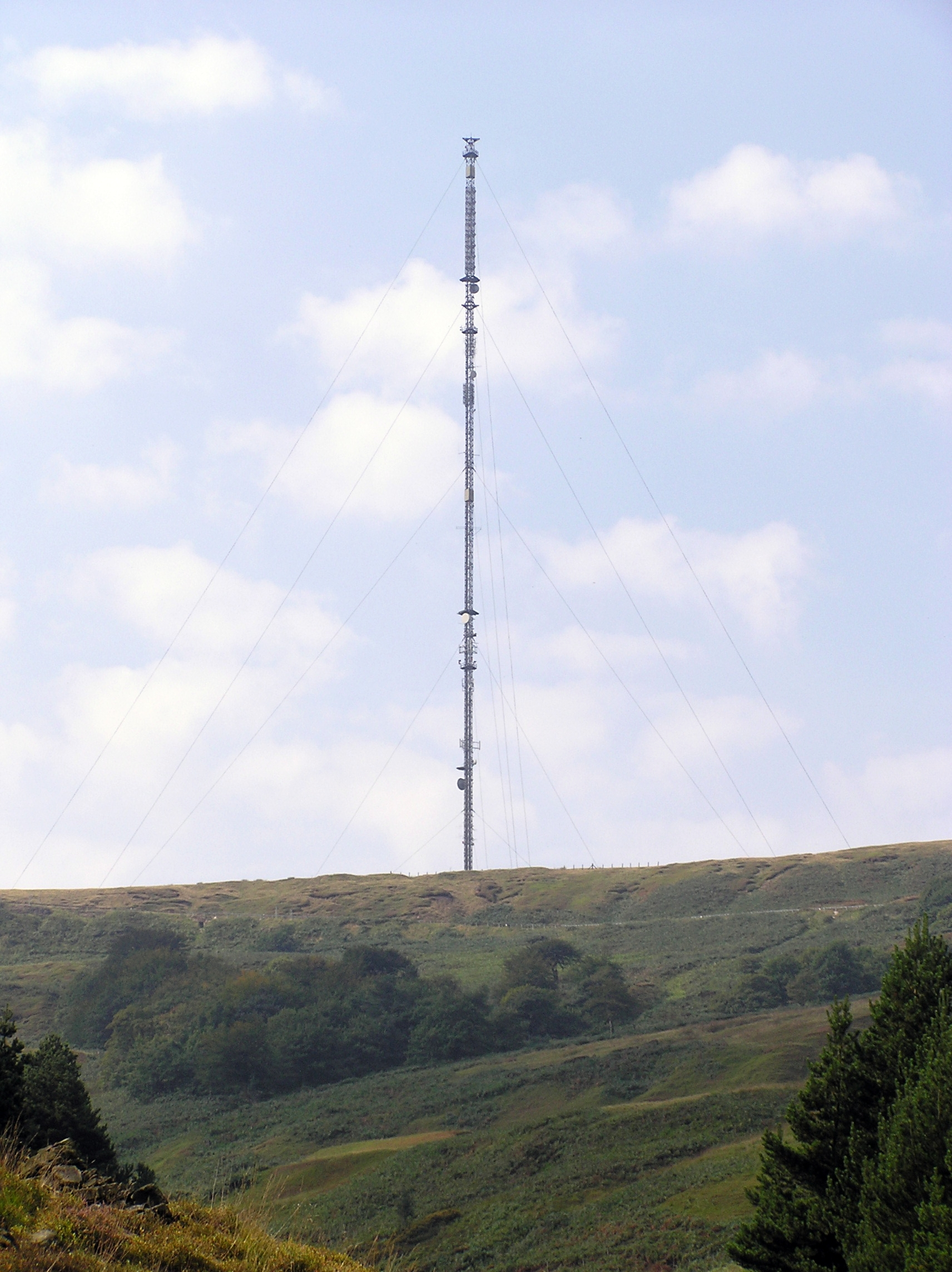
Holme Moss Radio Tower

Above the village is the 656 feet (200 m) tall Holme Moss radio transmitter, which is situated 1,726 feet (526 m) above sea level.
