= Ken Kern =

American builder and writer

Ken Kern was a builder and author who devoted himself to aiding owner-builders, and believed strongly in living on the land. He lived outside of North Fork, California at the time of his death and lived for many years on a self-built homestead outside Oakhurst, California

Despite being an experienced builder and proponent of earth sheltering, Kern was killed when an earth roof he designed collapsed on him.

== Written works ==
Writings by Kern include:

- The Owner-Built Home
- The Owner-Built Homestead
- The Owner-Built Pole Frame House
- The Earth Sheltered Owner-Built Home
- The Owner Builder & the Code: Politics of Building
- The Work Book: Personal Politics of Building Your Home
- The Healthy House: An Owner-Builders Guide to Biological Building
- Ken Kern's Homestead Workshop
- Ken Kern's Stone Masonry
- Ken Kern's Masonry Stove
- Fireplaces
