= Underhill, Holme =

Earth-sheltered home in Holme, West Yorkshire, England

Coordinates: 53°33′00″N 1°50′11″W

Underhill at Holme, West Yorkshire, England, is a modern house designed by Arthur Quarmby in 1969 and built from 1973 to 1975. It has been Grade II listed on the National Heritage List for England since July 2017.

Underhill was the first earth-sheltered house to have been built in Britain in modern times. Historic England described the property as "representing a significant milestone in the development of ecological and sustainable architecture".

It was built at a cost of £50,000 and was constructed by J. B. Kenworthy of Holmfirth.

The house features a 36-foot (11 m) hourglass-shaped swimming pool centrally located in the main room, with a large octagonal pyramid conservatory-style skylight window in the ceiling above the centre of one of its circular ends.
