= Alice City =

Proposed underground suburb in Tokyo

Alice City was a concept proposal for an underground suburb in Tokyo, Japan, submitted by the Taisei Corporation in 1989. It was never built.

== Concept ==
The Alice City design was publicised in 1989. It would have been split into three primary sectors – Town Space, Office Space, and Infrastructure Space, accessed by underground railway from a hub, called the Alice Terminal, and was promoted as being the first in a potential chain of similar structures.

=== Town Space ===
The Town Space would have consisted of "verdant underground boulevards", free of traffic and containing shopping plazas, fitness centers, and theatres in addition to residences.

=== Office Space ===
The Office Space would have housed office buildings, hotels, parking lots, and expanded shops. "Solar domes" above office complexes would try to combat claustrophobia. Hotels and offices would be connected to the surface through the use of express elevators.

=== Infrastructure Space ===
The Infrastructure Space would handle utilities, such as power generation, heating, and sewage treatment.

=== Alice Terminal ===
The hub of the city, Alice Terminal, would have been topped by a 120-meter wide clear dome, 180 meters below the ground. Several railway links would lead out from the terminal to other complexes, and the terminal itself would be landscaped with parks and green space, as well as containing medical facilities, shopping centers, and other amenities for convenience.

== Advantages ==
Many advantages were cited for the plan, primarily the fact that moving infrastructure—primarily industry, offices, and shops—underground would free up large amounts of space above ground for redevelopment into parks and green space. The effects of earthquakes would also be greatly reduced underground, diminishing to 1/3 to 1/7 their original levels at only 30 meters below ground. The need for heating would also be diminished, due to temperatures underground holding at a stable 13–15 °C (55–59 °F).

== Disadvantages ==
A primary issue in development of underground cities is that, in the event of a fire or similar disaster, it would be difficult if not impossible to evacuate everyone inside, requiring the construction of separate areas with independent supplies of power and air. Issues of land ownership also hampered the development of Alice City due to Japanese law regarding bodies owning properties above and below ground at the same time.

== See also ==
- Arcology
- Shimizu Mega-City Pyramid
