= Thermal lag =

Thermal lag describes a body's temperature with respect to time as a result of its thermal mass. A body with high thermal mass (high heat capacity and low conductivity) will have a large thermal lag.

$\text{Thermal Lag}(s) = {L \over \sqrt{2 \alpha \Omega}}$

where $\alpha$ is the thermal diffusivity of the material (m^{2}s^{−1}), $\Omega$ is the external angular frequency (s^{−1}), and $L$ is the thickness (m).

== Examples ==
In buildings with concrete or masonry walls, thermal lag can result in a difference between the highest interior and highest outdoor temperatures several hours apart. This delay may shift cooling loads to later periods, when air-conditioning systems can operate with cooler outdoor conditions or when the building is not being actively cooled.

The slow night-time cooling of a home after its external brick wall has been heated by the sun is another example of thermal lag. Thermal lag is the reason the high temperatures in summer continue to increase after the summer solstice (in this case, it is termed seasonal lag), and it is the reason a day's high temperature peaks in the afternoon instead of when the Sun is at its peak (12 noon).

== See also ==
- Heat transfer
- Stokes boundary layer
