= Jeremy Ogden =

American lacrosse player

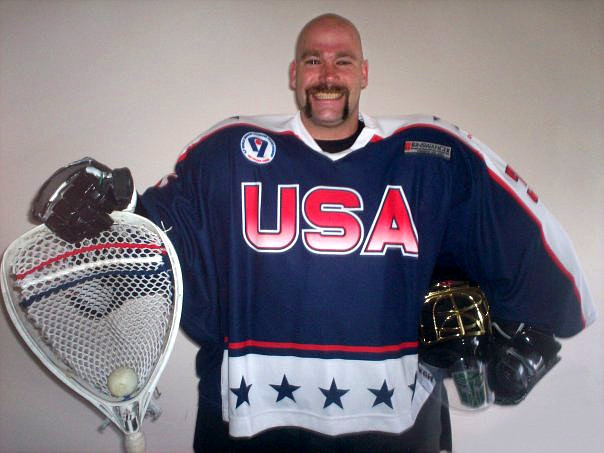
- Ogden in his Team USA Jersey from 2007

Personal information
- Nicknames: Wookie, Chewy
- Born: September 30, 1975 (age 51) Downingtown, PA, US
- Height: 6 ft 0 in (183 cm)
- Weight: 220 lb (100 kg; 15 st 10 lb)

Sport
- Position: Goaltender
- Shoots: Right
- NLL team: Colorado Mammoth
- Pro career: 2006–

Jeremy Ogden (born in 1975 in the Philly suburbs) was a goaltender for the Colorado Mammoth in the National Lacrosse League and started for the Colorado Sabertooths National Championship teams in 2012 and 2013. He played college lacrosse for Colorado State University from 1993 to 1995. In 2006, he was named to the United States indoor Lacrosse Team to compete in the World Indoor Lacrosse Championship in 2007 but did not see any action in the Bronze Medal campaign. A year later in the 2008/2009 National Lacrosse League season he was signed by the Colorado Mammoth as a goalie. As a member of the Mammoth, he saw minimal action in one game in his home town of Philadelphia. During an exhibition season in 2009, the Colorado Sabertooths lacrosse team competed in the Freedom Cup sponsored by USA Indoor Lacrosse in Philadelphia, PA. After defeating all of the other regional and state teams they lost to Team USA's entry to the tournament, finishing as National Runners-Up in their inaugural year.

== Career ==
Due to a statistical anomaly, Jeremy is credited with the lowest GAA in the entire NLL for the 2009 season with an average of 0.0 goals allowed. He faced zero shots during this appearance. He set several more notable records at Colorado State University as a starting freshman and sophomore, (Most saves in a Game with 33, Most starts by a freshman with 14, Most shots faced in a game at 59), but those records were later wiped off the books when the coaching regime changed at CSU in the late 1990s. After being named a MILA/CILL All-Star in August 2012, he faced the newest incarnation of Team USA in an exhibition game at the Sears Centre outside Chicago. Playing in Tandem with another goalie, the pair carried their squad to a 14–8 victory. Ogden started the second half, stopping 28 shots and allowing only 3 goals. Ogden never lost a game as the starting goalie for the Sabertooths, and was named a Star of the Championship Game in 2012, defeating the previous years champions, the Grand Rapids Dragonfish 13–6. Ogden allowed 4 goals and tallied more than 30 saves, before stepping aside for his backup with under five minutes to go in the match.

In his adopted home state of Colorado, Jeremy won more than a dozen championships with 7 teams.

== Coaching ==
He coached for the Alexander Dawson School boys' lacrosse teams from 2006 until 2011.

== Retirement ==
On September 19, 2013, Ogden sustained a serious concussion in an exhibition game mid-season and was forced to retire from elite lacrosse. As he recovered from the concussion, Ogden tried his hand in the announcing booth. He commentated the 2013 Continental Indoor Lacrosse League's National Championship Game between his Colorado Sabertooths and the Chicago Outlaws for the National broadcast of the game on In Lax We Trust Radio.

In retirement, Ogden is coaching youth box lacrosse goalies locally and across the country in clinics and camps, as well as private lessons for some students.
