= Alexander Dawson =

Alexander Dawson may refer to:

== People ==
- Alexander Dawson (MP) (c 1771–1831), MP for County Louth 1826–1831
- Alexander Dawson (architect), New South Wales Government Architect 1856–1862
- Alex Dawson (1940-2020), Scottish footballer

== Schools ==
- Alexander Dawson School (disambiguation)
  - Alexander Dawson School, private school located in Lafayette, Colorado
  - The Alexander Dawson School at Rainbow Mountain, independent, day school in Summerlin, Nevada
