= Underground House Colorado =

Underground House in Colorado

- Mountain Home; Stapp Lakes Ranch
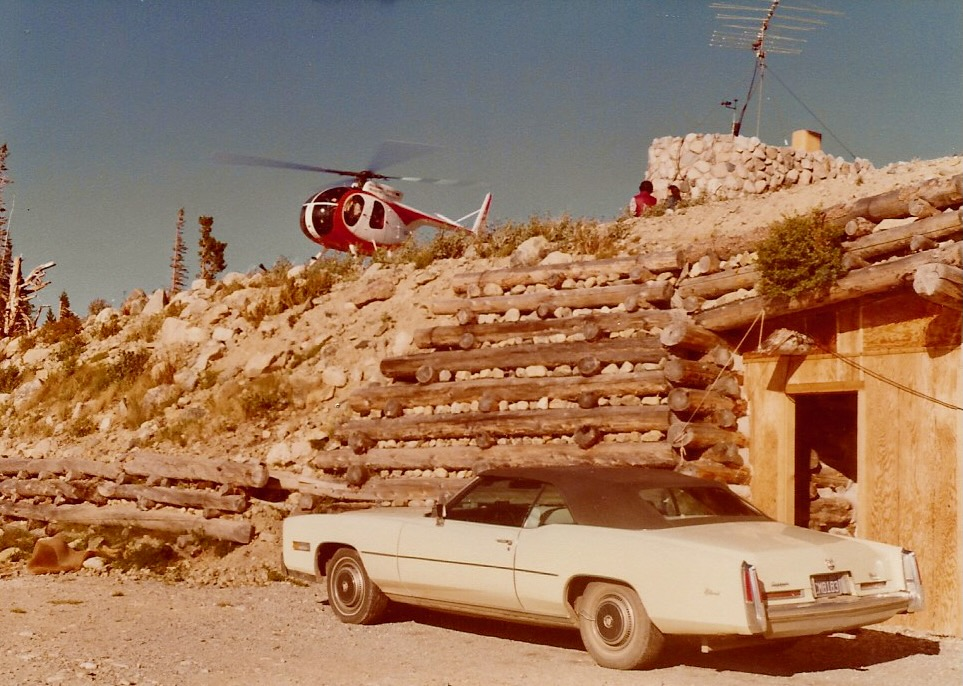
- Entrance to the underground house in Ward, Colorado
- Interactive map of the Underground House Colorado area

General information
- Type: Private
- Architectural style: Ranch-style house
- Location: Ward, Colorado, U.S.
- Coordinates: 40°7′5″N 105°32′42″W
- Opened: 1964
- Closed: ca. 1988

Height
- Architectural: Underground

Technical details
- Material: Concrete and steel
- Size: 3,400 sq ft (320 m^{2})
- Floor count: 1

Design and construction
- Architect: Jay Swayze
- Architecture firm: Underground World Homes

The Underground House in Ward, Colorado, was a subterranean dwelling which was designed by architect Julian "Jay" Swayze (1923–1981) in the 1960s. It was included in the Underground World Home exhibit at the 1964 New York World's Fair.

== History ==
In 1962, Jay Swayze, a Texas contractor, was asked by the city of Plainview, Texas to construct an underground home using government civil-defense plans. Swayze, appalled by the request, began to build a 2,800 square feet (260 m^{2}) underground ranch house which he called the "Atomitat”, a play on the words "Atomic" and "Habitat".

Girard Henderson, director of Avon Products, visited this bomb shelter and commissioned Swayze and his brother, Kenneth Swayze, to build another underground home in Colorado for himself. In exchange, Henderson helped founded the Underground World Home Corporation, bought 51% of the shares and helped finance building an underground house for an exhibit at the 1964 World's Fair in New York.

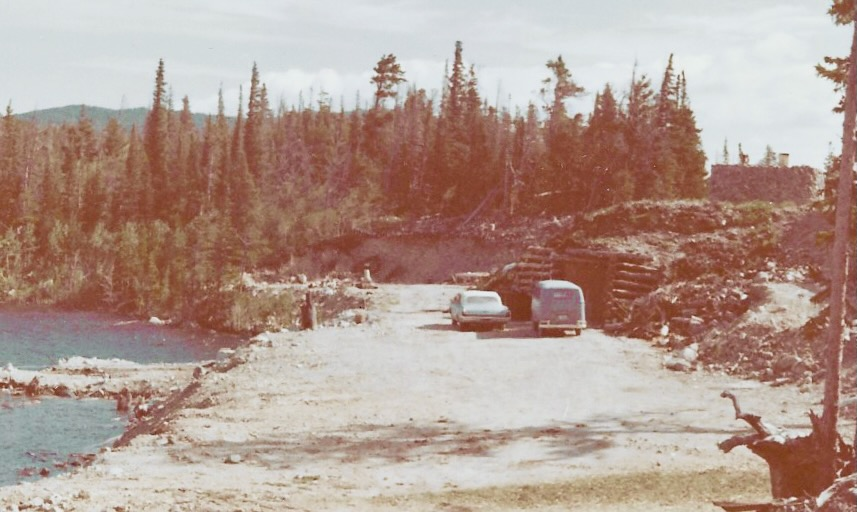
Underground near House Ward, Colorado

== See also ==
- Underground World Home
- Underground living
