= Alexander Dawson School =

Alexander Dawson School may refer to:

- The Alexander Dawson School at Rainbow Mountain
- Alexander Dawson School (Lafayette, Colorado)
