= Underground House Las Vegas =

Underground House in Las Vegas

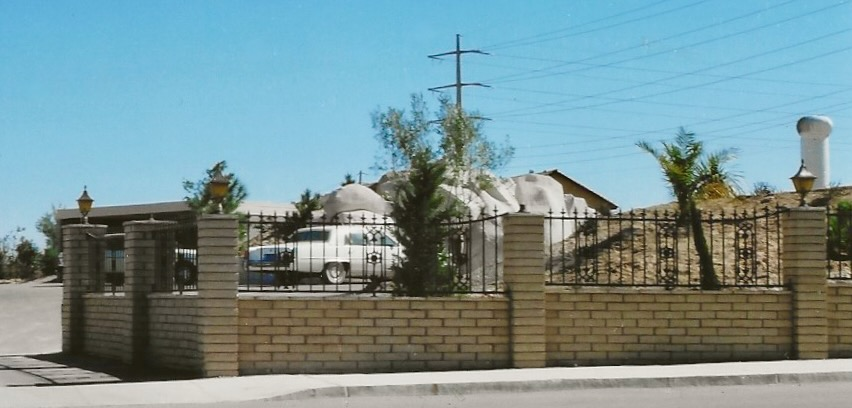
- Underground House in Las Vegas, Nevada

General information
- Type: Private
- Architectural style: Ranch-style house
- Location: 3970 Spencer Street, Las Vegas, Nevada, U.S.
- Coordinates: 36°7′0″N 115°7′38″W
- Opened: 1978
- Cost: $1 million
- Client: Girard B. Henderson
- Owner: STASIS Foundation

Height
- Architectural: Underground

Technical details
- Material: Concrete and steel
- Size: 16,000 sq ft (1,500 m^{2})
- Floor count: 1

Design and construction
- Architect: Jay Swayze
- Main contractor: Frank Zupancic

Website
- www.undergroundhouse.vegas

The Underground House in Las Vegas, Nevada, is a Cold War-era subterranean dwelling. This structure was built in the wake of the Cuban Missile Crisis. The house was completed in 1978.

== History ==
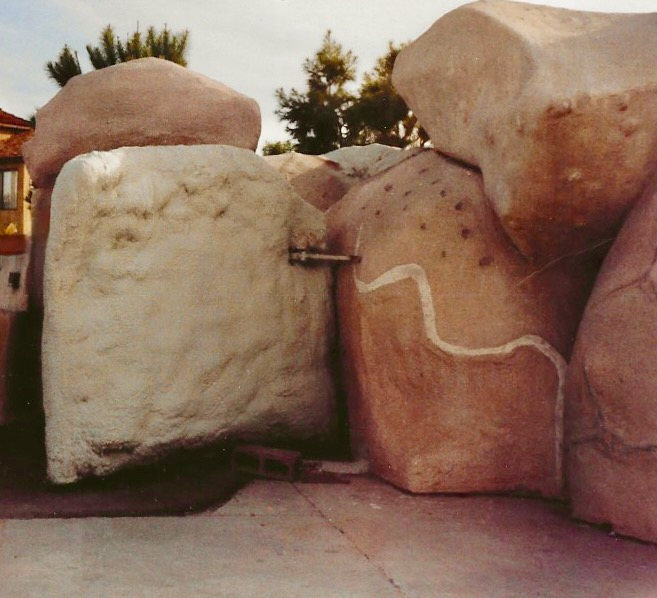
Initially, the only way to enter the Underground House was through this boulder front door.

In 1969, the Avon Products executive Girard B. Henderson relocated to Las Vegas, Nevada, and embarked on the construction of the Dawson buildings on Spencer Street and an underground house across the street, which took from 1974 to 1978 to build. Oswald Gutsche, the president of Alexander Dawson Inc., oversaw the building of a new underground residence. This dwelling was inspired by the designs of Jay Swayze and served as a model. He enlisted Frank Zupancic, a private contractor who had previously constructed Oswald Gutsche's home, to undertake the construction. Henderson and his wife chose to reside in this subterranean abode, located on 3970 Spencer Street.

To access the underground home, a stairwell or a 23 ft (7.0 m) elevator descent takes people below ground level, opening into the entry of the residence. The underground property consists of several key features, including the 6,000 sq ft (560 m^{2}) home centered in the 16,000 sq ft (1,500 m^{2}) space.

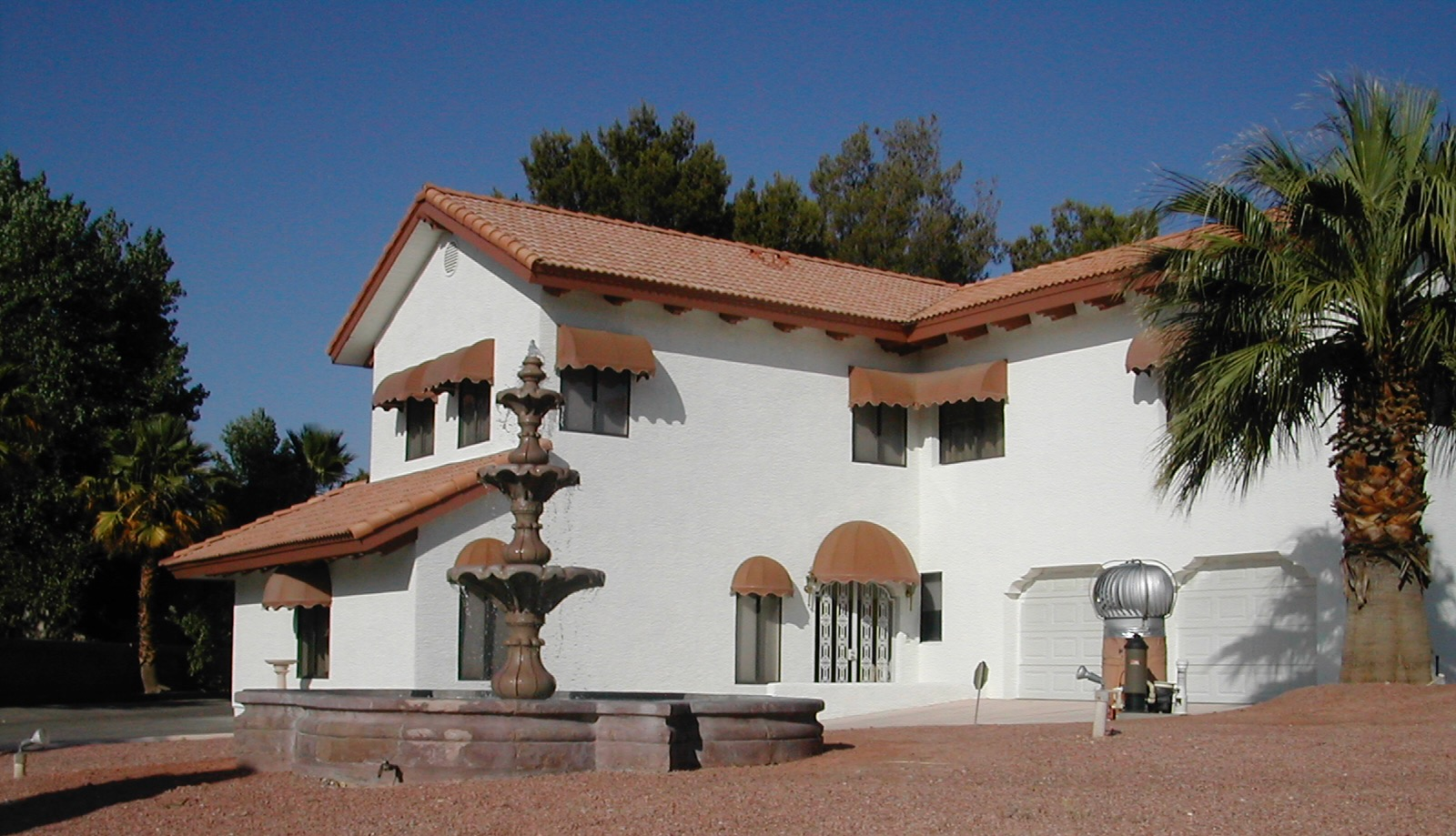
3970 Spencer Street two-story above ground home built for Mary Henderson

After Henderson died on November 16, 1983, his wife Mary lived in the underground house for a short while. Following her death on October 1, 1988, businessman Thomas "Tex" Edmonson (1908–2003) acquired the underground property. As the second husband of Lucy Henderson, Tex Edmonson purchased the property under the Tex-Tex Corporation, becoming the new owner of the underground dwelling.

An article appeared in The New Yorker magazine, which talked about Susan Roy, a magazine editor and architecture historian, who saw images of family fallout shelters including this one back in 2003, in Nest magazine (published from 1997 to 2004). The experience resulted in a book she wrote, Bamboozled: How the U.S. Government Misled Itself and Its People into Believing They Could Survive a Nuclear Attack.

== Design ==
The Ranch-style house is 23 ft (7.0 m) underground and has brick veneer siding but is enclosed in a waterproof concrete shell measuring approximately 16,000 sq ft (1,500 m^{2}) and covered with a compacted earth berm. The Clark County, Nevada Records show that the Underground House is on 1.05 acres (0.42 ha). The main house itself encompasses three bedrooms and three bathrooms, and includes a small guest quarters. The home, designed to sustain life for approximately one year, was equipped with an underground generator and fuel tank."

The interior design of this home serves as a reflection of the Cold War era during which it was constructed. The prevailing atmosphere at the time, particularly in the aftermath of the Cuban Missile Crisis, was one of heightened concern among Americans regarding the looming threat of nuclear war. The homeowner held a firm conviction that the United States and the Soviet Union might continue to intensify their conflict, ultimately leading to a catastrophic nuclear confrontation.

The underground area has been designed to imitate an above-ground setting, including grass-looking carpet as an imitation lawn, artificial trees and wall to wall, floor to ceiling scenery. A fireplace chimney channeled smoke through a "trunk and branches" of a fake tree on the surface. The house was lit with nearly 1,000 fluorescent lights. These lights, in four colors, enabled the night sky to simulate a sunrise.

The muralist Jewel Smith painted the Trompe-l'œil murals to depict Henderson's sheep ranch in Cecil Peak Station, New Zealand, the ranch he owned in Colorado, a view of Los Angeles from Beverly Hills, and a depiction of his childhood home in Suffern, New York.

== Current state ==
The underground property has changed hands over the years. The property sold in 1990 for $1.3 million after Henderson died, and again in 2005 for $2 million. The current owners bought it in 2014 for $1,150,000. In 2019 it was again on the market for $18 million, then in 2024 reduced to $5.9 million. The purchasers, under the name "Society for the Preservation of Near Extinct Species," made the decision to maintain their anonymity while acquiring the property, which is now recognized as the Stasis Foundation.

== See also ==
- 1964 New York World's Fair
- Earth shelter
- Underground World Home
- Underground living
