= Wallaceburg Satans =

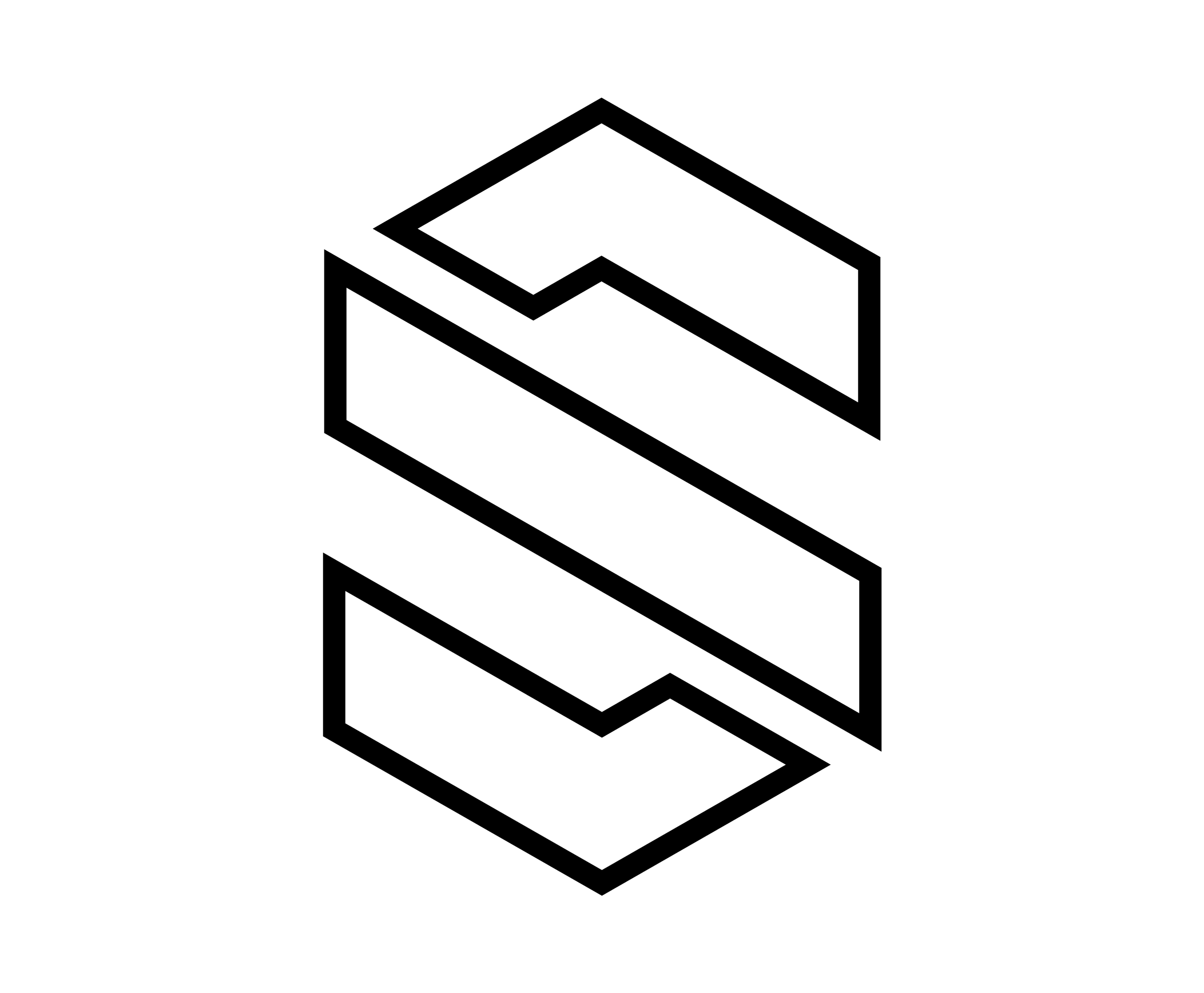
- City: Wallaceburg, Ontario
- League: Box Lacrosse League
- Founded: 2017
- Home arena: Wallaceburg Memorial Arena
- Colors: Red, Black, White
- Owner(s): Chris Fox
- Captain: Jason Fox
- Media: CKXS-FM
- Website: wallaceburgsatans.com

Current uniform
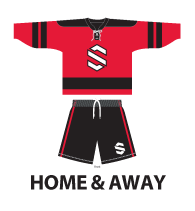

The Wallaceburg Satans are the first Canadian men's senior semi-professional box lacrosse team to play in the Box Lacrosse League. The Satans play their home games out of the "Wonder on Wall St." Wallaceburg Memorial Arena in Wallaceburg, Ontario.

== History ==
The Satans made their inaugural appearance during the 2017 Box Lacrosse League. The first goal in franchise history was scored in Wallaceburg, during their first game at 2:21 in first period by Brady McDonald. The Satans won the game by the score of 11–6 over the Chicago Outlaws. Haven Moses and Bobby Smith split the win in net.

They finished the 2017 BLL regular season with a record of 5-1 and faced the Chicago Outlaws in the 2017 BLL Semi-Finals, played at the Midwest Orthopedic Sports Center in Brookfield, Wisconsin losing the game by a score of 12–11.

=== Prior to 2017 ===
Wallaceburg has been home to several other senior men's lacrosse teams. In 2016 Wallaceburg was the home to the OLA Sr. B Wallaceburg Thrashers who moved to Wallaceburg from Sarnia where they were called the Sarnia Beavers. Other former OLA Sr. B teams include the St. Clair Storm, who split games between, Wallaceburg, Sarnia, and Walpole Island.

Many other teams in Wallaceburg have played under the Satans banner, including both Senior B and Junior B teams in the 1960s and 1970s.

=== Retired Numbers ===
George "Jug" McGaffey - #9

== Season-by-Season ==
Note: GP = Games Played, W = Wins, L = Losses, T = Ties, PTS = Points, GF = Goals For, GA = Goals Against

Season	GP	W	L	T	GF	GA	PTS	Finish	Playoffs	Captain
2017	6	5	1	0	82	43	10	2nd of 5 BLL	Lost semi-final, 11-12 (Outlaws)	Jason Fox

== Current Players ==
No.	Nat	Player	Pos	S/G	Age	Acquired	Birthplace
33	(Canada)	Eric Shepley	G	L	30	2017	Wallaceburg, Ontario
00	(Iroquois)	Haven Moses	G	R	33	2017	Wallaceburg, Ontario
1	(Iroquois)	Bobby Smith	G	R	37	2017	Walpole Island
93	(Canada)	McKenzie Turner	D	R	32	2017	Wallaceburg, Ontario
27	(Canada)	Steve Lilley	D	R	38	2017	Wallaceburg, Ontario
13	(Canada)	Jesse Gross	D	R	38	2017	Wallaceburg, Ontario
24	(Canada)	Justin Belanger	D	R	36	2017	Wallaceburg, Ontario
10	(Canada)	Justin Dewhirst	D	R	37	2017	Wallaceburg, Ontario
21	(Canada)	Brad Holbrough	D	L	41	2017	Petrolia, Ontario
2	(Canada)	Matt Murphy (A)	D	L	36	2017	Wallaceburg, Ontario
3	(Iroquois)	Neejig Shognosh	D	L	38	2017	Walpole Island
47	(Canada)	Zac Nicholson		L	27	2017	Tupperville, Ontario
18	(Canada)	TJ Mara		R	33	2017	Sarnia, Ontario
55	(Canada)	Brady McDonald		R	38	2017	Oil Springs, Ontario
19	(Iroquois)	Devin Sands		L	30	2017	Walpole Island
17	(Canada)	Kyle VanDamme (A)		L	37	2017	Wallaceburg, Ontario
22	(Canada)	Evan Mathany	F	R	29	2017	Wallaceburg, Ontario
88	(Canada)	Connor Smith	F	R	32	2017	Sarnia, Ontario
77	(Canada)	Jason Fox (C)	F	R	45	2017	Wallaceburg, Ontario
6	(Canada)	Kyle O'Neil	F	R	40	2017	Wallaceburg, Ontario
11	(Canada)	Brandon McFarlane	F	R	40	2017	Sarnia, Ontario
26	(Iroquois)	Colton Hart	F	L	30	2017	Walpole Island
16	(Canada)	Josh Lucier	F	L	37	2017	Wallaceburg, Ontario
8	(Canada)	Chad Murphy	F	L	38	2017	Wallaceburg, Ontario
66	(Canada)	Reid Miller	F	L	34	2017	Port Lambton, Ontario
