= Box Lacrosse League =

U.S. senior men's box lacrosse league

- Sport: box lacrosse
- Founded: 2011
- No. of teams: 5
- Most recent champion: St. Louis Centurions (2017)
- Most titles: Colorado & Cleveland (2 each)
- Website: boxlacrosseleague.com

The Box Lacrosse League (BLL) was a senior men's semi-professional box lacrosse league in the United States. In its final year, the league consisted of five teams with a geographical footprint centered on the Midwest region of the United States and Ontario.

Formerly known as Midwest Indoor Lacrosse Association (MILA), the league was renamed the Continental Indoor Lacrosse League due to expansion teams outside of the Midwest region in March 2013. The league again changed its name in 2017 to Box Lacrosse League, citing the new commitment to following guidelines set by USBOXLA. The league ceased operations after the 2017 season.

== History ==
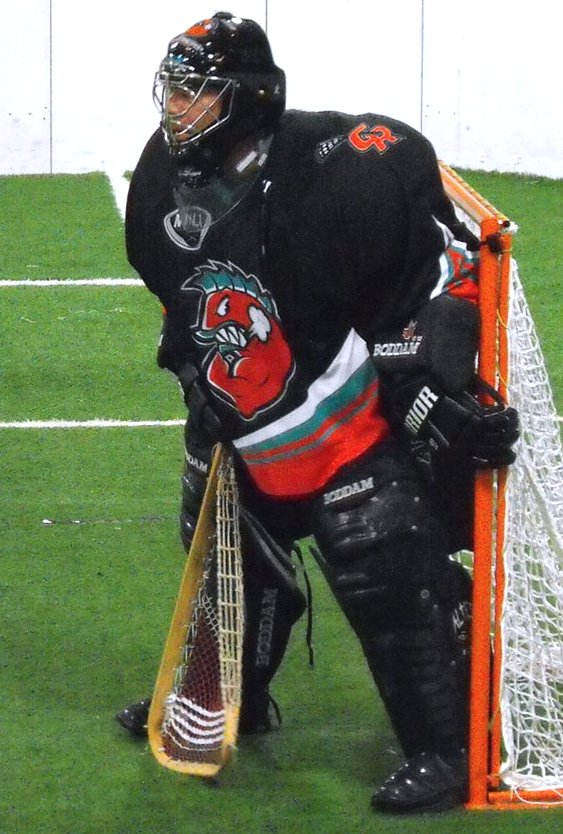
Minto Cup winning veteran goalie Dave Holding. Grand Rapids Dragonfish goaltender since team's inception.

=== 2011 ===
On August 27, 2011, Grand Rapids defeated Columbus 18-17 (OT) in the first-ever MILA game. Columbus went on to have the best record and were the top seed for the inaugural championship playoff, but Columbus withdrew on the day before the event. Second-seed Grand Rapids Dragonfish went on to claim the first league championship by defeating Chicago 13-7 on October 1, 2011. Chicago had advanced with a 26-1 semifinal win against Milwaukee.

=== 2012 ===
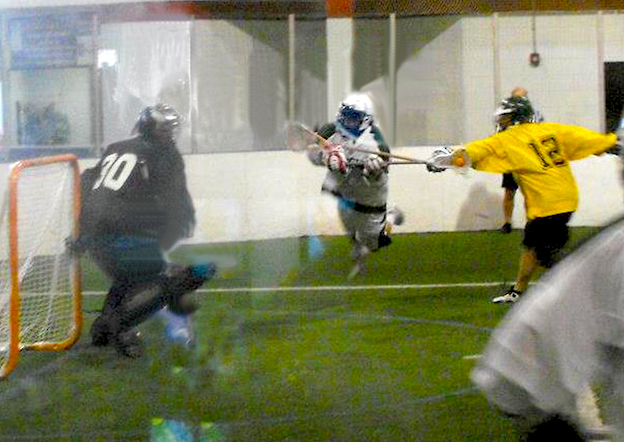
Columbus Brew player (white) sails past Detroit Coney Dogs' Owen Blank (yellow) as he attempts a dive shot on Coney Dogs goalie Devan Mighton (black) during 2012 season.

In the off-season, several expansion teams were announced for the second season of MILA. The St. Louis Pride, Pittsburgh Octane, Southern Ohio Box Lacrosse, Cleveland Demons, Detroit Coney Dogs, and Nebraska Fighting Perkins were all announced before the end of the calendar year. Three more teams (Madison Capitals, Minnesota Jaxx, and Colorado Sabertooths) were also announced for the 2012 season. Nebraska never materialized and a group from Indiana took over the franchise rights, adding Indy Swagger to the league.

Colorado was crowned champion after the 2012 season, when 10 teams competed in league play. St. Louis and Nebraska/Indy failed to get its team off the ground.

=== 2013 ===
Expansion was again on the off-season agenda as the Upstate Bears were named the 11th league member in February 2013. With the new geographical boundaries, the league again changed its name. In March 2013 MILA became the Continental Indoor Lacrosse League.

In May 2013, a league administration was announced. Grand Rapids GM Russ King was named commissioner of the CILL. Detroit GM Owen Blank (secretary) and Ray Kincaid (treasurer) of Chicago were also appointed.

Seven teams made up the CILL in 2013, with Colorado going undefeated to win the regular season and #1 seed for the CILL Cup playoffs. The Sabertooths went on to defeat Chicago 14-11 in the championship game and were crowned CILL Cup champions.

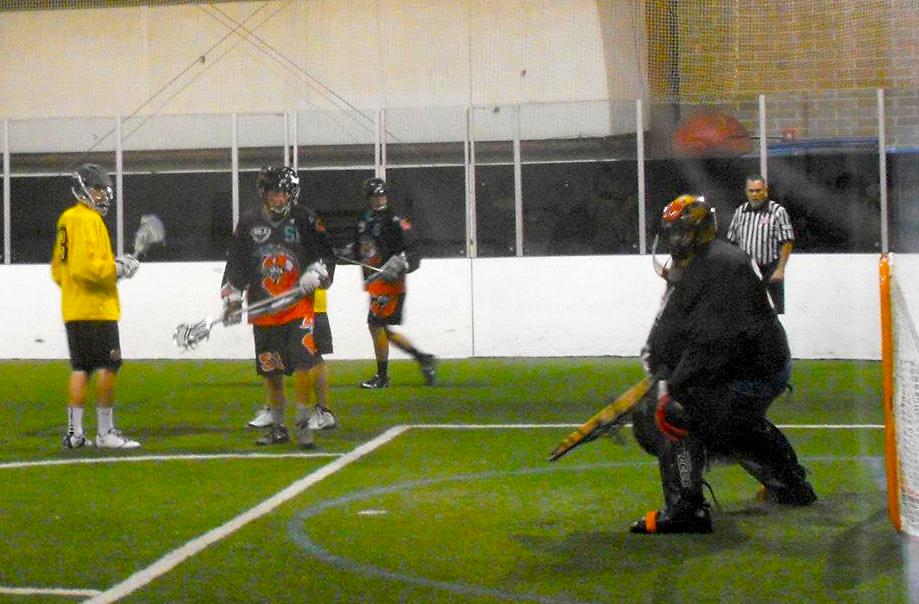
Grand Rapids Dragonfish shooter (black and orange) and Detroit Coney Dogs defender (yellow) look on as Coney Dogs goalie Devan Mighton (black) traps ball (2012).

=== 2014 ===
The Cleveland Demons announced that they would return to the CILL in 2014. The Demons competed in the league starting in 2012, but went on a 1-year hiatus. The CILL announced that the Lansing Hot Rods would join the league as full-time members after playing a limited exhibition schedule in 2013.

Just prior to the season the Colorado Sabertooths announced that they would not play in 2014. Soon after, the Columbus Brew pulled out of the season after multiple cancelled games. The Detroit Coney Dogs withdrew from league play after one game and a forfeit due to low player numbers.

Championship weekend took place September 27, 2014, in Chicago. Third place Milwaukee declined to participate so it became a three-team event. Second place Grand Rapids defeated the Pittsburgh Octane 20-7 in the semifinal to advance. Later that evening, the Chicago Outlaws defeated the Grand Rapids Dragonfish 20-13 to win their first CILL Cup.

=== 2015 ===
Leadership change came in the spring when A.J. Collier II took over as league commissioner. A schedule was released in early July with nine teams set to compete.

Just before the regular season it was announced that the expansion Minnesota Ox would be joining the league as a probationary team. Minnesota played exhibition games in 2015, but then ceased operations.

The Cleveland Demons won the championship, beating the Dragonfish.

=== 2016 ===
At the 2016 Winter Meeting that took place on March 19, the CILL accepted the application the expansion St. Louis Centurions.

=== 2017 ===
During the Winter Meeting, the Board of Governors voted to rebrand as the Box Lacrosse League. Governors also accepted the expansion Wallaceburg Satans.

St. Louis went undefeated during the season, capturing the BLL Cup.

== Teams ==
Team	City / Area	Arena	Founded	Joined	Head Coach
Chicago Outlaws	Palatine, Illinois	Salt Creek Sports Center	2011	2011	A.J. Collier II
Circle City Copperheads	Indianapolis, Indiana	Ellenberger Park	2015	2015	Ken Levinberg
Detroit Coney Dogs	West Bloomfield, Michigan	Inline Hockey Center	2011	2012	Owen Blank
St. Louis Centurions	Ballwin, Missouri	Midwest Sport Hockey	2016	2016	Troy Hood
Wallaceburg Satans	Wallaceburg, Ontario	Wallaceburg Memorial Arena	2016	2017	Chris Fox

== Former teams ==
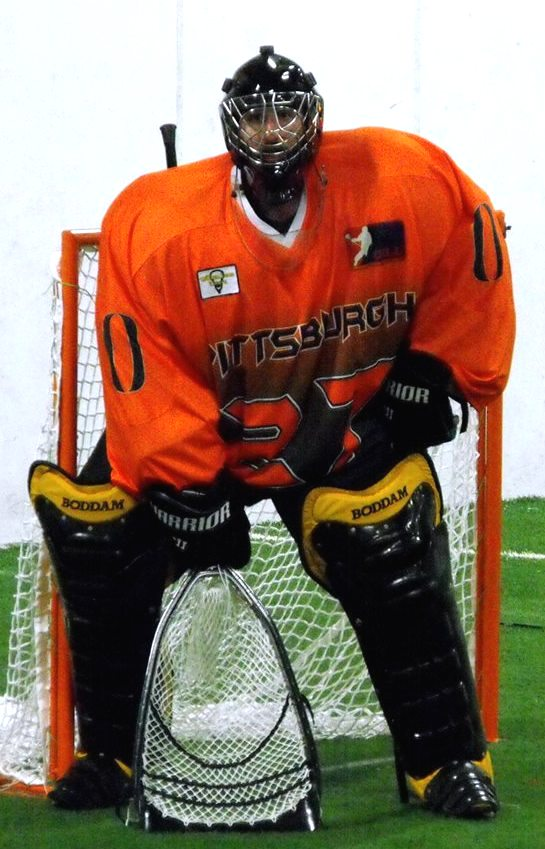
Pittsburgh Octane goalie Tom Roule in 2014.

- St. Louis Pride – added 9/2011**
- Southern Ohio Box Lacrosse (2012)
- Nebraska Fighting Perkins – added 11/2011**
- Indy Swagger – added 2/2012**
- Madison Capitals – added 2/2012**
- Minnesota Jaxx (2012)
- Upstate Bears – added 2/2013**
- Colorado Sabertooths (2012–2013)
- Columbus Brew (2011–2013)
- Grand Valley State Lakers (2015)
- Minnesota Ox – added 2/2015**
- Lansing Hot Rods (2014–2015)
- Milwaukee Marauders (2011–2015)
- Pittsburgh Octane (2012–2015)
- Grand Rapids Dragonfish (2011–2016)
- Cleveland Demons (2012–2016)

** = added as expansion teams, but never competed in league play

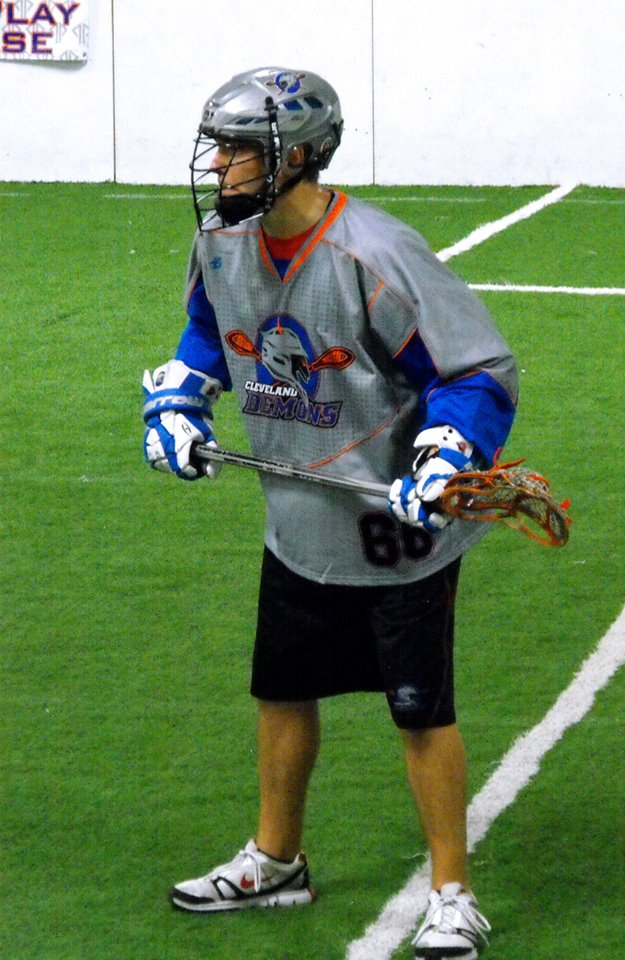
Cleveland Demons runner Hans Rydquist in 2014.

== Champions ==
Year	Champion	Finalist	Score
2011	Grand Rapids Dragonfish	Chicago Outlaws	13-7
2012	Colorado Sabretooths	Grand Rapids Dragonfish	13-6
2013	Colorado Sabretooths	Chicago Outlaws	14-11
2014	Chicago Outlaws	Grand Rapids Dragonfish	20-13
2015	Cleveland Demons	Grand Rapids Dragonfish	13-7
2016	Cleveland Demons	Chicago Outlaws	13-10
2017	St. Louis Centurions	Chicago Outlaws	12-7
