= West Career and Technical Academy =

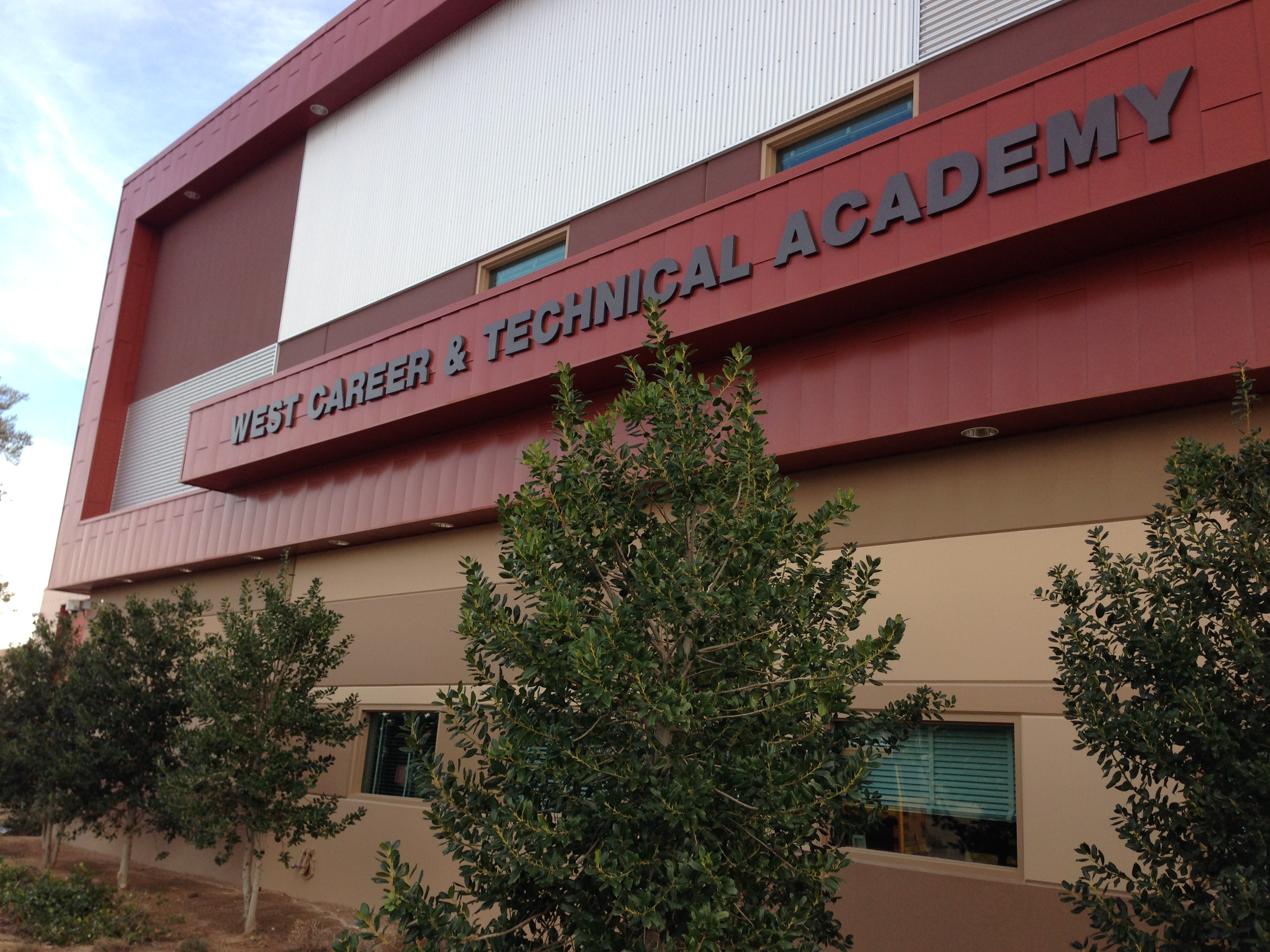
- Façade in January 2014

Location
- 11945 W. Charleston Blvd. Las Vegas, NV 89135
- 36°9′28″N 115°21′14″W

Information
- School type: Magnet public high school
- Established: 2010
- School district: Clark County School District
- Principal: Amy Dockter-Rozar
- Staff: 60.00 (FTE)
- Grades: 9–12
- Enrollment: 1,511 (2023-2024)
- Student to teacher ratio: 25.18
- Website: wctawranglers.com

West Career and Technical Academy (WCTA, West Tech) is a magnet high school located in Las Vegas, Nevada, United States. The school opened in August 2010 as the first magnet school in Summerlin, a community in the western Las Vegas Valley. It is administered by the Clark County School District. As of 2019, the school had an enrollment of 1,397 students and 61 classroom teachers on a FTE basis, for a student-teacher ratio of 23:1. West Tech offers nine programs to prepare students for a career in the field selected.

== History ==
After one and a half years of construction costing $83.5 million, West Tech opened to students on August 30, 2010. It is the last high school built under a 1998 bond program to revitalize schools in the Clark County School District (CCSD), which involved the construction, replacement, and rehabilitation of more than 100 schools. For its first year of operation, West Tech admitted 750 freshmen and sophomores.

In December 2014, student Angelique Clark applied to begin a pro-life club at the school; however, the administration denied her application, claiming the subject was too controversial. She proceeded to send two demand letters to CCSD, but when she failed to receive a response, she sued West Tech in August 2015. The following month, the school agreed to the formation of the club.

== Facilities ==
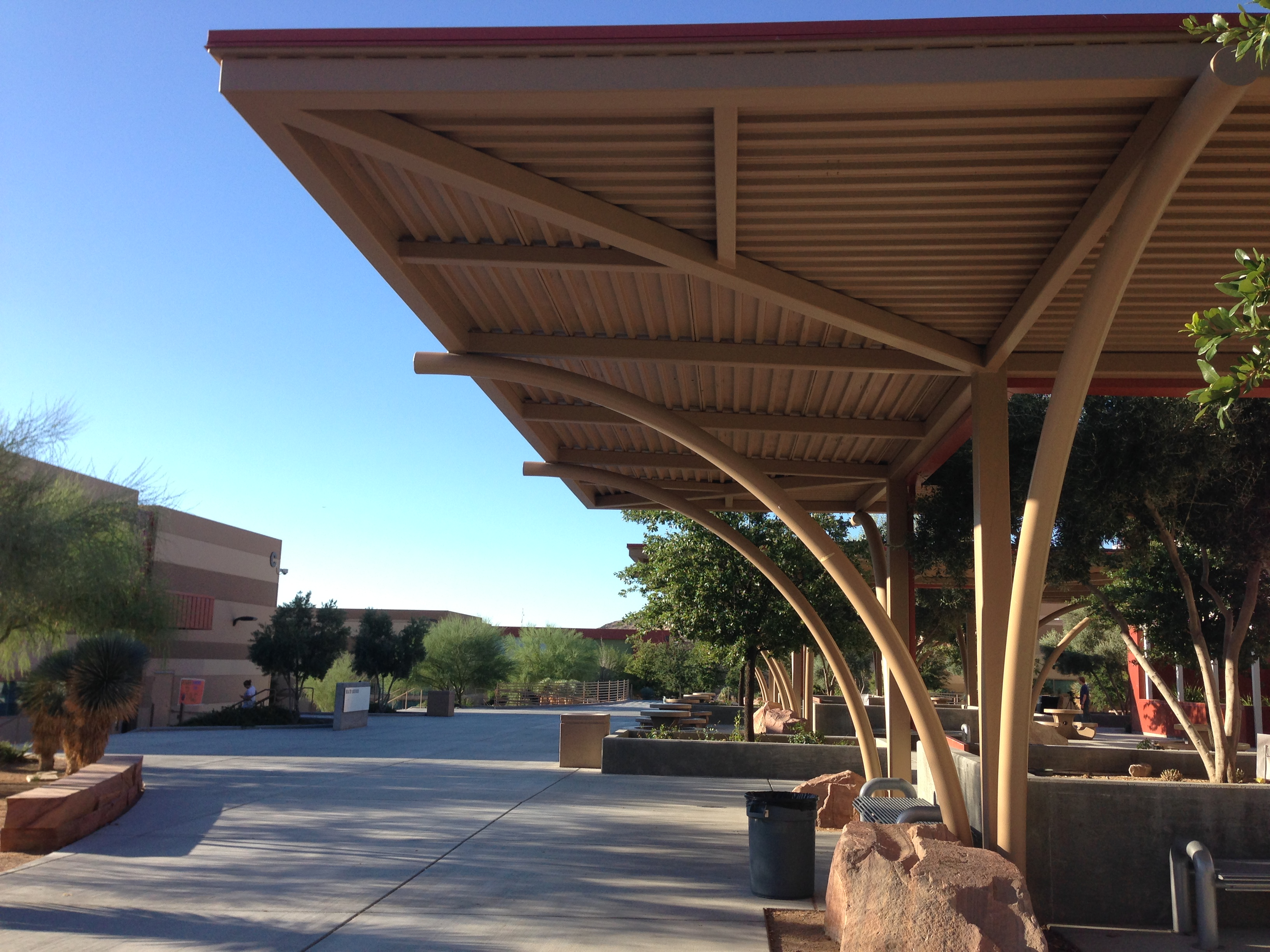
WCTA campus, September 2014

The school is built on 42 acres (17 ha) of land at the foothills of the Red Rock Canyon National Conservation Area. The buildings of the school occupy 224,884 square feet (20,892 m^{2}).

A rotating solar panel and a ground heat source exchange system help to power the campus. There is also a computerized weather station and four greenhouses, which are used to facilitate students' learning in horticulture, biotechnology, and other fields. West Tech also includes multiple computer labs and a student WiFi system.

== Academics ==
West Tech offers the following nine programs: .

- Biomedical Science
- Biotechnology
- Business Management
- Cybersecurity
- Digital Art & Design
- Engineering
- Environmental Science
- Nursing Assistant
- Sports Medicine

Students select one of these programs to study throughout high school, designed to assist them in future studies and a career in the field. A student must be enrolled in West Tech by their sophomore year so that all required classes for their program can be completed in a timely manner; for this reason a student may not change their chosen program after sophomore year.

West Tech utilizes the Google Apps for Education, which grant each student a free e-mail account, access to Google Sites, and other services.

== Clubs and activities ==
WCTA offers several career and technical student organizations (CTSOs), including DECA, FBLA, Skills USA, FFA, and HOSA. There are no NIAA sports teams. The school is also home to Key Club and UNICEF club chapters, and offers honors societies, including National Honor Society (NHS), Mu Alpha Theta, Tri-M, and Spanish Honor Society (SHH). WCTA competes in the FIRST Robotics Competition as Team 7183 "W.A.R.", and in the VEX V5 Robotics Competition as Teams 89135A-E.

WCTA is home to a multitude of other clubs started by students with the assistance of faculty and classmates, including clubs like Mock Trial, Speech and Debate, K-Pop Club, Earth Club, and Architecture Club.

WCTA is also home to a competitive Cybersecurity Club. This club competes in national competitions such as CyberPatriot, National Cyber League, (NCL), among others. Many CyberPatriot teams from West CTA have scored highly nationwide and the club as placed 7th, 8th and 12th nationwide, respectively, in the past 3 Spring NCL Challenges.

== Project-based learning ==
West Tech incorporates two school-wide project-based learning (PBL) events per semester. During the PBL event, class periods are shortened by 10 minutes each in order to allow for a 30 minute PBL period, where students meet with every member of their program. Topics for the PBL vary, including exploring different cultures, researching new technologies, and improving school spirit.
