= Jay Swayze =

Underground home designer

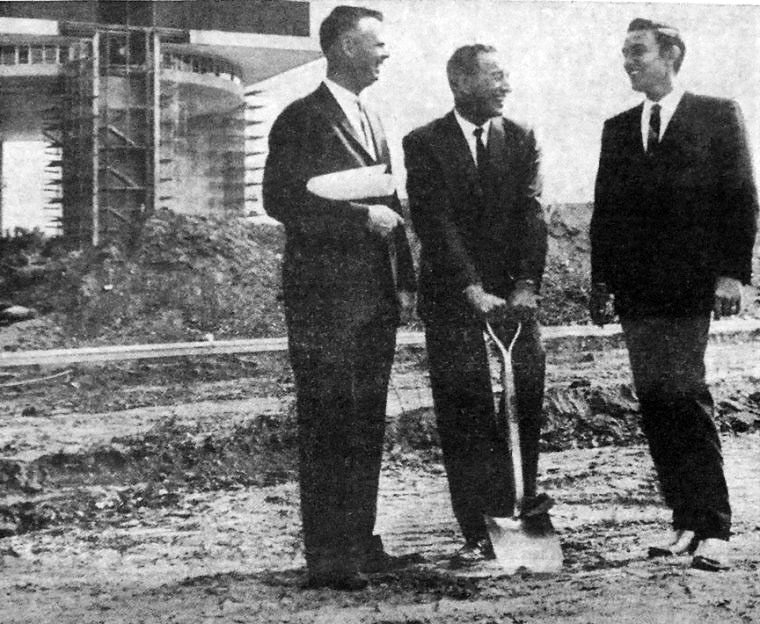
- October 1963 Jay Swayze (center) preparing to break ground on an underground house on the future site of the 1964 World’s Fair. At left is franchised-builder Walter Nolan, with entertainer Jimmy Dean at right.
- Born: Julian Harvey Swayze; 27 October 1923; Archer City, Texas, US
- Died: 12 June 1981 (aged 57); Amarillo, Texas, US
- Occupation: Architect
- Spouse: Ruth (née Boren) Swayze
- Children: 2
- Design: Atomitat; Underground World Home

Julian Harvey "Jay" Swayze (27 October 1923 – 12 June 1981) was an architect from Plainview, Texas best known for his creation of Underground World Home at the 1964 New York World's Fair, which proved to be not popular at the fair. During his career he was a promoter of underground living and he wrote a book called: Underground gardens & homes: The best of two worlds, above and below.

== Early life ==
He was married to Ruth (née Boren) Swayze and lived in Plainview, Texas with his wife and daughters in an underground home.

== Career ==
In his professional life he began as a luxury homebuilder. The majority of his career was spent promoting underground homes. Swayze cited solid research stating that people did not look out of their windows 80% of the time. He said when people did look out their windows, half the time what they saw was undesirable. He claimed that he could give people better views with murals.

In 1962 he designed an underground home he called the Atomitat. The home was designed during the cold war when Americans feared nuclear war. It was designed to be an "atomic habitat" which met civil defense specifications. He compared the Atomitat to a "ship in a bottle". There was a reinforced steel and concrete shell and it was 13 feet underground. The bunker had 4 bedrooms and 3 bathrooms and windows throughout which were meant to mimic outdoor scenes and outdoor lighting.

He billed his underground homes as Peeping Tom proof, more fun, less expensive and a way to save space above ground. He billed his homes as "safe harbor". He referred to his underground home construction design as a “ship-in-a-bottle” design.

He designed a home for the 1964 New York World's Fair and it was called the Underground World Home. The cost of the exhibit and home was one million dollars. Swayze was not able to make any sales of his underground homes from the fair exhibit. The home was designed for the company "Underground World Homes" which was owned by Avon investor (millionaire) Girard B. Henderson.

Swayze built two other homes for Henderson. The Underground House in Boulder Colorado at a 320 acres (130 ha) ranch on Stapp Lakes, near Ward, Colorado, the other the 16,500 sq ft (1,530 m^{2}) Underground House Las Vegas, Nevada. Both homes had a heated swimming pool, computerized lighting system, which turns day into night, and painted the murals within walkways that give the illusion of being outdoors. In 1996 the Las Vegas home was put up for sale for 8 million dollars.

In 1980, Swayze wrote a book promoting the underground living called Underground gardens & homes: The best of two worlds, above and below.

== Death ==
Swayze suffered a heart attack 11 June 1981 while riding in a car with one of his employees. He was transported by ambulance to High Plains Baptist Hospital in Amarillo, Texas and he arrived in critical condition. He died in the hospital the next day.
