= Atomitat =

Underground home

- Interactive map of the Atomitat area

General information
- Type: Underground
- Location: 2906 W. 20th, Plainview, Texas, U.S.
- Coordinates: 34.201667°N 101.739722°W
- Groundbreaking: 1961
- Completed: 1962
- Cost: $135,000
- Client: Jay Swayze

Height
- Top floor: 2 car garage

Dimensions
- Other dimensions: 13 ft (4.0 m) underground

Technical details
- Material: Concrete and steel
- Floor area: 2,800 sq ft (260 m^{2})

Design and construction
- Architect: Jay Swayze

Atomitat (1962) was an underground bunker-home in Plainview, Texas, designed by architect Jay Swayze. The name of the home came from the combination of the words "atomic" and "habitat". It was the first home in the U.S. to meet civil defense specifications for a nuclear shelter.

== History ==
Architect Jay Swayze stated that the idea for the Atomitat was born when he attended a civil defense discussion on fallout shelters. The home completed in 1962 and it was designed during the cold war when Americans feared nuclear war. Swayze said that the Atomitat was designed to be an atomic habitat which met the civil defense specifications. The cost of the furnished Atomitat with two vehicles was estimated to be $135,000. The Swayze's also stated that because the Atomitat home was secure against damaging weather, their home insurance rate was about 87.5% less than the rate of an above ground home.

In 1967 the Atomitat was featured in a U.S. Information Agency propaganda film. The film was part of a series showing scenes of American life, and it would be shown in Arab countries.

== Design ==
Architect Jay Swayze compared his design to a "ship in a bottle". There was a reinforced steel and concrete shell and it was 13 ft (4.0 m) underground and it is under 3 ft (0.91 m) of soil. It is 2,800 sq ft (260 m^{2}) in size. The bunker had 4 bedrooms and 3 bathrooms and windows throughout which were meant to mimic outdoor scenes and outdoor lighting. The home was outfitted with an emergency generator and sewage system. The above ground structure was a garage with a door between two large garage doors. The door led to the shelter which had 2 large steel lined things with lead to protect against radiation.

The house was designed to make the occupant feel as if they were above ground. Lights could be made to mimic the different parts of the day and there was an 18 in (46 cm) space between the living space and the outer wall which had a flow of air. This allowed an occupant to open a window and feel a breeze.

The house was occupied by the same family for 35 years. The couple who owned it decided to sell it in 2002 because it was too large now that their family had grown up.
