= Grand Rapids Dragonfish =

- Founded: 2011
- Based in: Grand Rapids, Michigan
- Arena: Eagles Ice Center
- Colors: Burnt Orange and Sea Green
- General manager: Russ King
- Website: http://grandrapidslacrosse.com

The Grand Rapids Dragonfish were a men's senior semi-professional box lacrosse team in the Continental Indoor Lacrosse League. They played at the Eagles Ice Center in Grand Rapids. Grand Rapids won the 2011 CILL championship, becoming the league's first champion. The Dragonfish were original members of the CILL having played since the inaugural 2011 season.

== History ==
=== 2011 ===
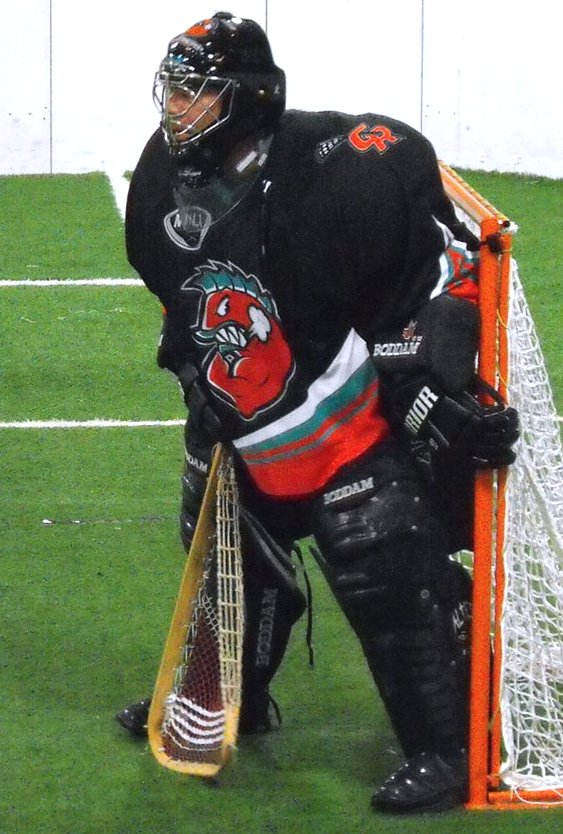
Minto Cup winning veteran goalie Dave Holding. Team's primary goaltender since its inception.

Grand Rapids played in the first ever game in MILA history, where they defeated Columbus 18-17 in overtime. The Dragonfish would go on to defeat the Chicago Outlaws in the championship on October 1, 2011, with a final score of 13–7.

=== 2012 ===
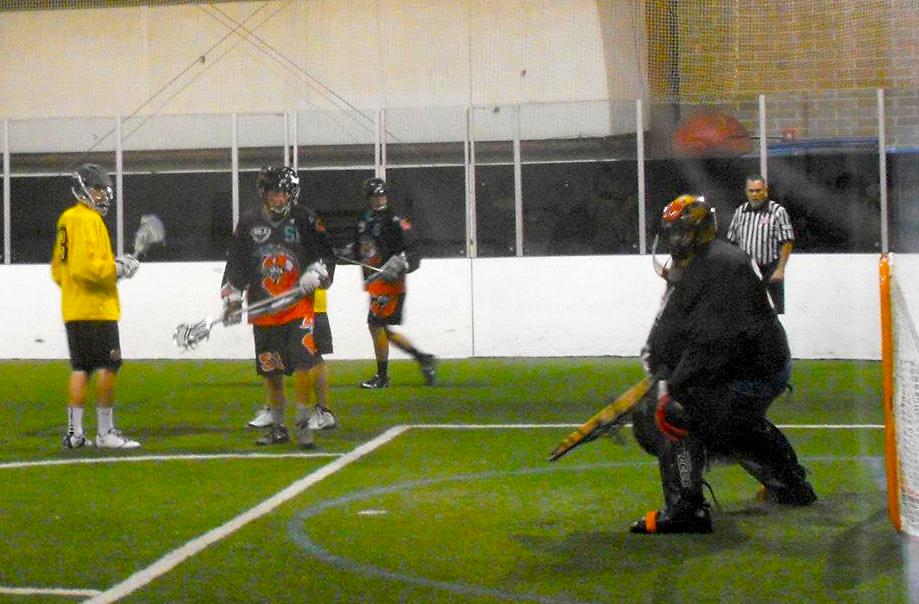
Dragonfish shooter and Detroit Coney Dogs defender (yellow) look on as Coney Dogs goalie Devan Mighton (black) traps ball (2012).

A second Michigan-based team, the Detroit Coney Dogs, joined the MILA bringing the number of teams in Michigan to two. The Dragonfish fared well in the regular season as well in the playoffs. They appeared in the 2012 championship, but lost to the Colorado Sabertooths by a final score of 13–6.

=== 2013 ===
The Dragonfish finished with a regular season record of 3–2. Grand Rapids made it to the semifinals, losing to Chicago 10–9 in overtime. Grand Rapids went on to play in the Third Place game where they defeated Pittsburgh 9–0. In that game veteran player Russ King (also the commissioner of the CILL) scored what he said was his last CILL goal. King commented after saying, “This was my last competitive game for the Fish; I want to work on growing the CILL and making it better year-after-year and spreading box lacrosse in the U.S.”

=== 2014 ===
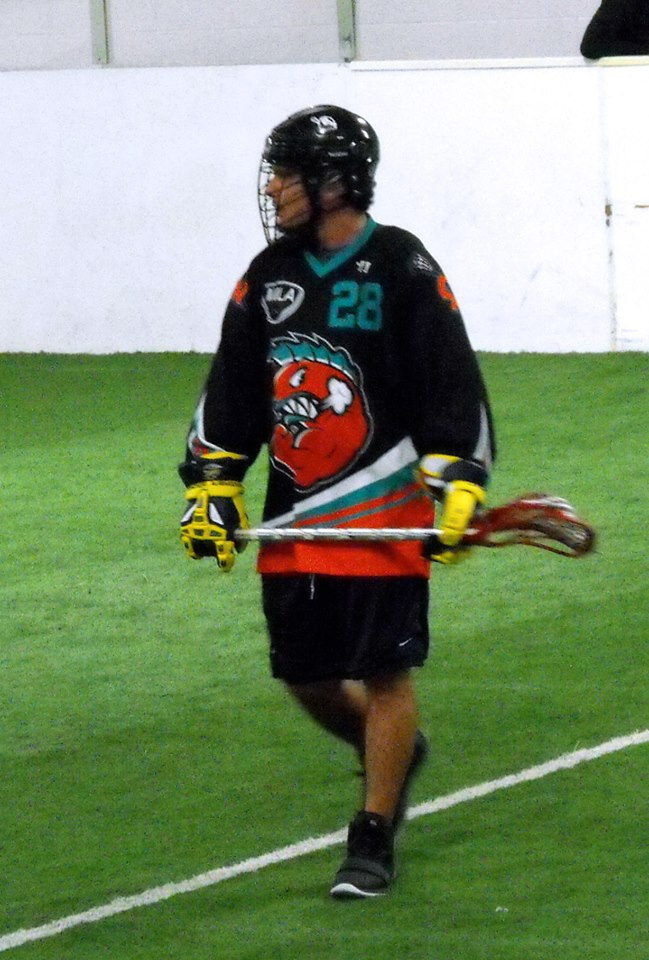
Whitby, Ontario product Zack Palmer during 2014 season.

In 2014 the Lansing Hot Rods joined the CILL, bringing the number of Michigan teams up to three. In this season the Dragonfish played seven games and finished with a 6–1 record. The Dragonfish made it to the CILL championship, but were defeated by the Chicago Outlaws by a score of 20–13.

== Season-by-season ==
Season	W	L	Pts	Result	Playoffs
2011	4	2	8	1st (tied)	Champion
2012	8	0	16	1st	Runner-up
2013	3	2	6	4th	3rd Place
2014	6	1	12	2nd	Runner-up
2015				TBD	TBD
