= Underground World Home =

Underground home model designed in 1964

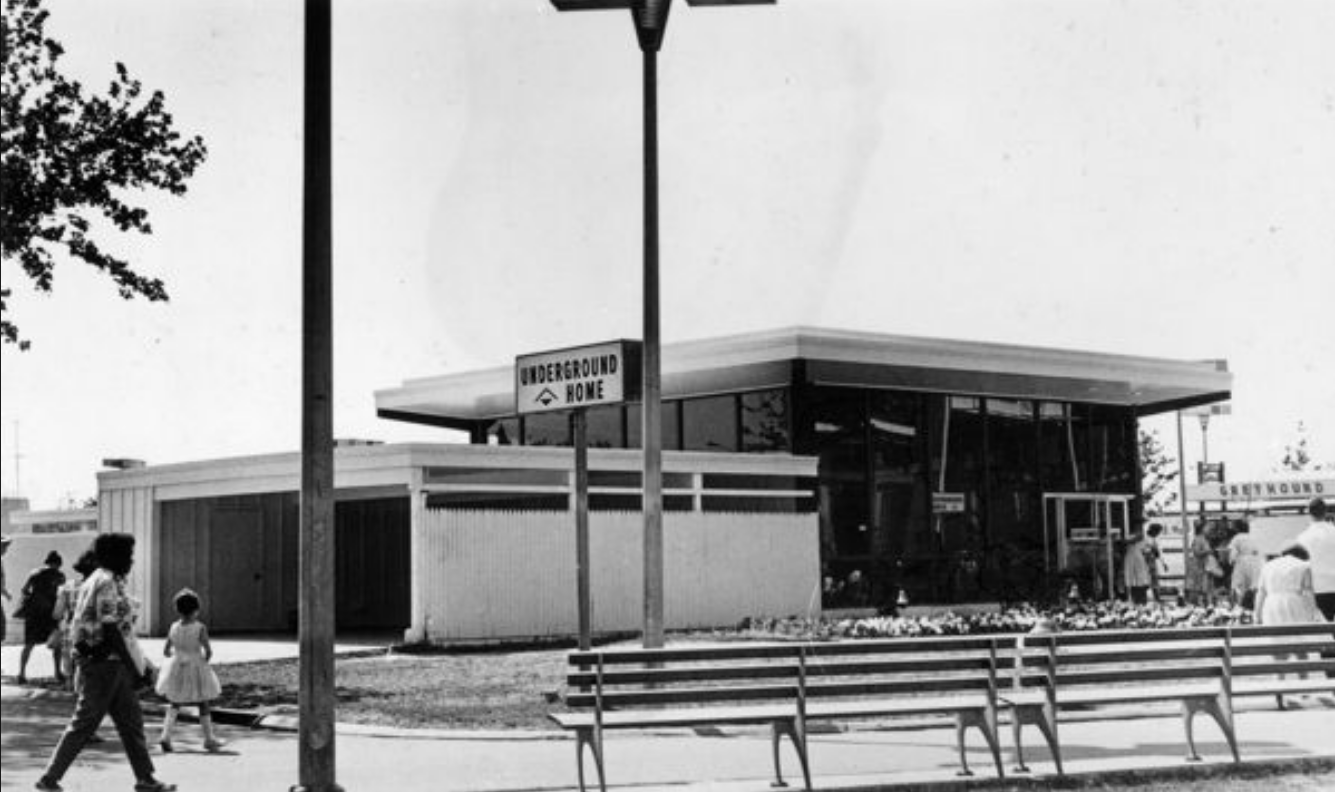
- Underground World Home exhibit
- Interactive map of the Underground World Home area

General information
- Status: Demolished
- Location: Flushing Meadows Park, Queens, New York, U.S.
- Coordinates: 40.74580°N 73.85136°W
- Opened: 1964
- Closed: 1965
- Demolished: March 15, 1966
- Cost: Exhibit: $1 million
- Client: 1964 New York World's Fair
- Owner: Girard B. Henderson

Height
- Architectural: Underground

Technical details
- Material: Concrete and steel
- Floor count: 1
- Floor area: 6,000 sq ft (560 m^{2})

Design and construction
- Architect: Jay Swayze
- Other designers: Interior designer Marilyn Motto

The Underground World Home was an exhibit at the 1964 New York World's Fair of a partially underground house which doubled as a bomb shelter. Designed by architect Jay Swayze, who made a specialty of underground homes, it was situated on the campus of the expo besides the Hall of Science and north of the expo's heliport in Flushing Meadows–Corona Park in Queens.

== History ==
The home/bomb shelter was designed by architect Jay Swayze. Swayze, a proponent of underground living, constructed and lived in his own underground bunker-house in Plainview, Texas, which he named Atomitat.

Built during the Cold War only two years after the Cuban Missile Crisis, it was the promotion of the company "Underground World Homes", which was owned by Avon investor and millionaire Girard B. Henderson, who remained convinced that tensions between the U.S. and the U.S.S.R. would escalate eventually escalate to WWIII. (In addition to the prototypical underground home/bomb shelter, there was companion chthonic exhibit sponsored by Henderson: "Why Live Underground?") The brochure for the Underground World Home touted its comfort, luxury, interior design and safety. However, the $1.00 for adults and 50¢ on top of the expo's fee entry, plus the expo's numerous, much more glamorous exhibits, deterred many potential tourists. A May 1964 LIFE magazine cover story on the exposition did not so much as mention the Underground World Home.

Exhibits were contractually required to be dismantled and removed after the fair. Swayze eventually wrote a book, Underground Gardens & Homes: The Best of Two Worlds, Above and Below, but the building's fate was not mentioned. The New York Public Library held archives on the expo, however, and in 2017 it was found that the demolition of the home had been completed on March 15, 1966. Only its foundations, if anything, remain.

== Design ==
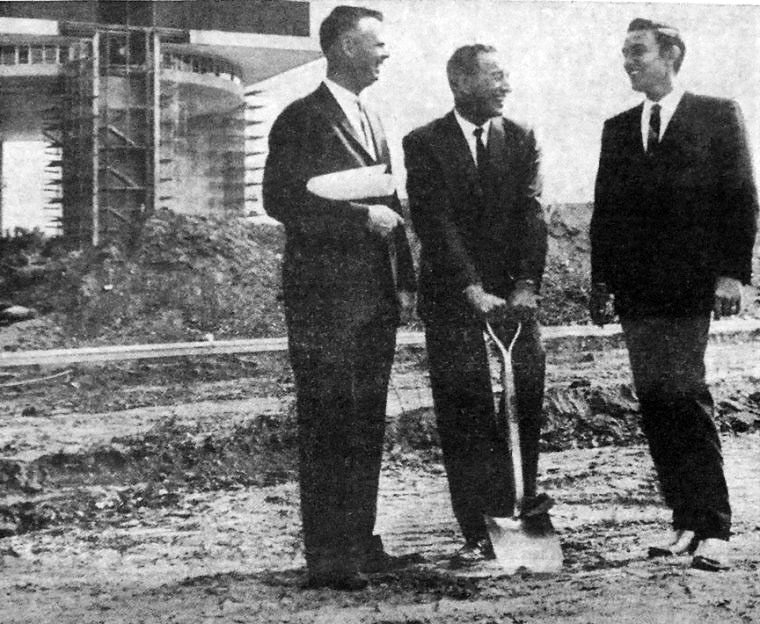
October 1963 groundbreaking event by Jay Swayze. Constructor Walter Nolen on the left is holding the blueprints; entertainer Jimmy Dean observes the proceedings.

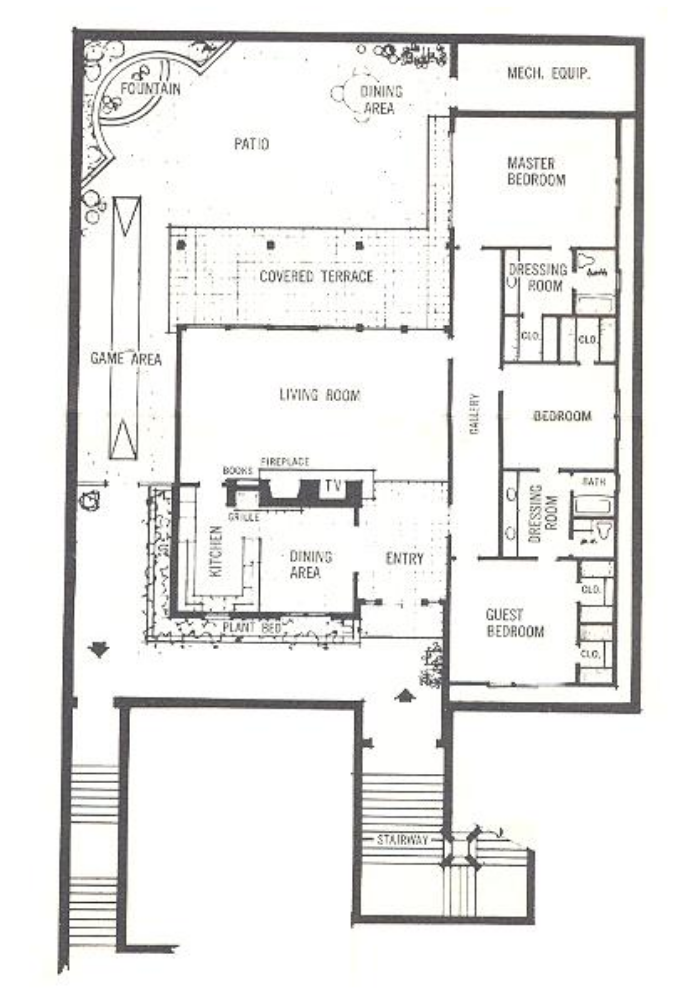
Floor plan

The ten-room home featured backlit murals to create the illusion of outdoor space and preclude claustrophobia. The murals were painted by Texas-based artist Mrs. Glenn Smith. Swayze cited research to convince fairgoers that people did not look out their windows 80% of the time, and that and when people did look out their windows, half the time what they saw was undesirable. He stated that he could give people better views with selected murals. The home was touted as peeping Tom proof, less expensive than normal homes, (sic), secure from intruders, and a way to save space above ground.

The home was 6,000 sq ft (560 m^{2}). The walls were 20 in (51 cm) of steel and concrete, and the roof supported by 18 in (46 cm) steel beams rated for a load of two million pounds (910,000 kg) of soil (which provided the insulation). There were three bedrooms; the ceilings were of gypsum. There was a "snorkel-like system" for air conditioning— an apparatus which purportedly enabled the home to be dusted monthly.

The foyer was 143 sq ft (13.3 m^{2}), the kitchen/dining room 299 sq ft (27.8 m^{2}) , the living room (with a television set and a wood-burning fireplace) 680 sq ft (63 m^{2}), and three bedrooms of 336 sq ft (31.2 m^{2}), 336 sq ft (31.2 m^{2}), and 256 sq ft (23.8 m^{2}), respectively, connected by a hallway 6 feet (1.8 m) wide . The model home also had a terrace area simulating outdoor space next to the living room of 384 sq ft (35.7 m^{2}).

== Reception ==
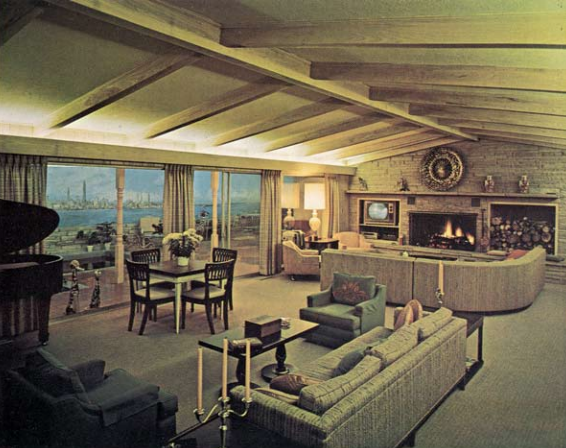
An underground home in Colorado, from the 1964 exhibit's brochure.

In a 1964 New York Times piece science fiction author Isaac Asimov speculated what the 2014 World's Fair would look like. He deemed the Underground World Home a "sign of the future" with controlled temperatures which allowed occupants to live free from the weather. The home was not a draw, however, and was scarcely to appear in popular memory. Priced at $80,000 (approximately four times the cost of an average home that year), none were commissioned.

== Popular culture ==
The LP record The Best of the Johnny Mann Singers: Underground at the Fair played in background of the exhibit; it did not sell well. This was its only appearance in pop culture (save in the niche mythos of urban exploration, and as one of the oddities of architecture) until its interior was reproduced in the 2009 CSI: NY episode Manhattanhenge as the anachronistic lair of a mad killer, the structure supposedly simply having had soil layered on top of it and been abandoned. The set was complex and impressive.

== See also ==
- 1964 New York World's Fair pavilions
