= Summerlin, Nevada =

Residential development in Las Vegas, US

Summerlin
- Planned community
- Neighborhood of Las Vegas, Nevada
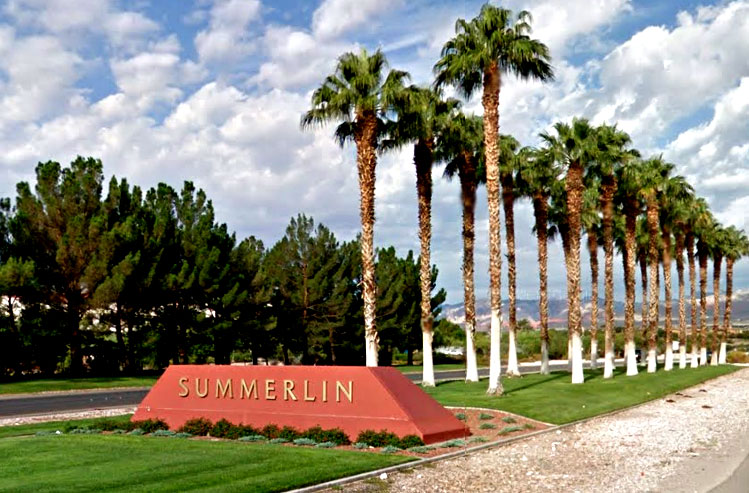
- Summerlin Entrance Marker

- Location within Nevada
- Coordinates: 36°11′N 115°20′W
- Country: United States
- State: Nevada
- County: Clark
- City: Las Vegas
- Founded: 1990; 36 years ago
- Founder: Summa Corporation
- Named for: Jean Amelia Summerlin
- Associations: Summerlin North; Summerlin South; Summerlin West; Sun City Summerlin; Siena

Summerlin is a master-planned mixed-use development mostly within the city limits of Las Vegas, Nevada. (Note: Except for Summerlin South (which is within unincorporated Clark County and is a census-designated place). Neither Summerlin nor Summerlin South are municipalities, towns, or cities of their own. Note that the term "unincorporated" as in unincorporated towns has a specific legal definition in Nevada.)

== History ==
In 1952, reclusive casino and film executive Howard Hughes purchased 30,000 acres (12,000 ha) of land along the western edge of the Las Vegas Valley for $3 per acre in an area valued at $1.27 million in 2022 USD, according to development company, Howard Hughes Holdings.

In the early 1970s, despite initial intentions to reposition some of his business operations in Nevada, Hughes eventually chose not to relocate his core companies. Even though Hughes did not relocate operations, he became the largest single land owner in Nevada and, for a time, the largest employer in the state, with over 8,000 on his payroll.

The land remained largely undeveloped for decades. In the mean time, the first large-scale master-planned community in Nevada, Green Valley in Henderson, began development.

In 1976, after Hughes died from kidney failure, his heirs organized the Summa Corporation (now Howard Hughes Holdings), named for Hughes's paternal grandmother Jean Amelia Summerlin, to manage his businesses and land holdings.

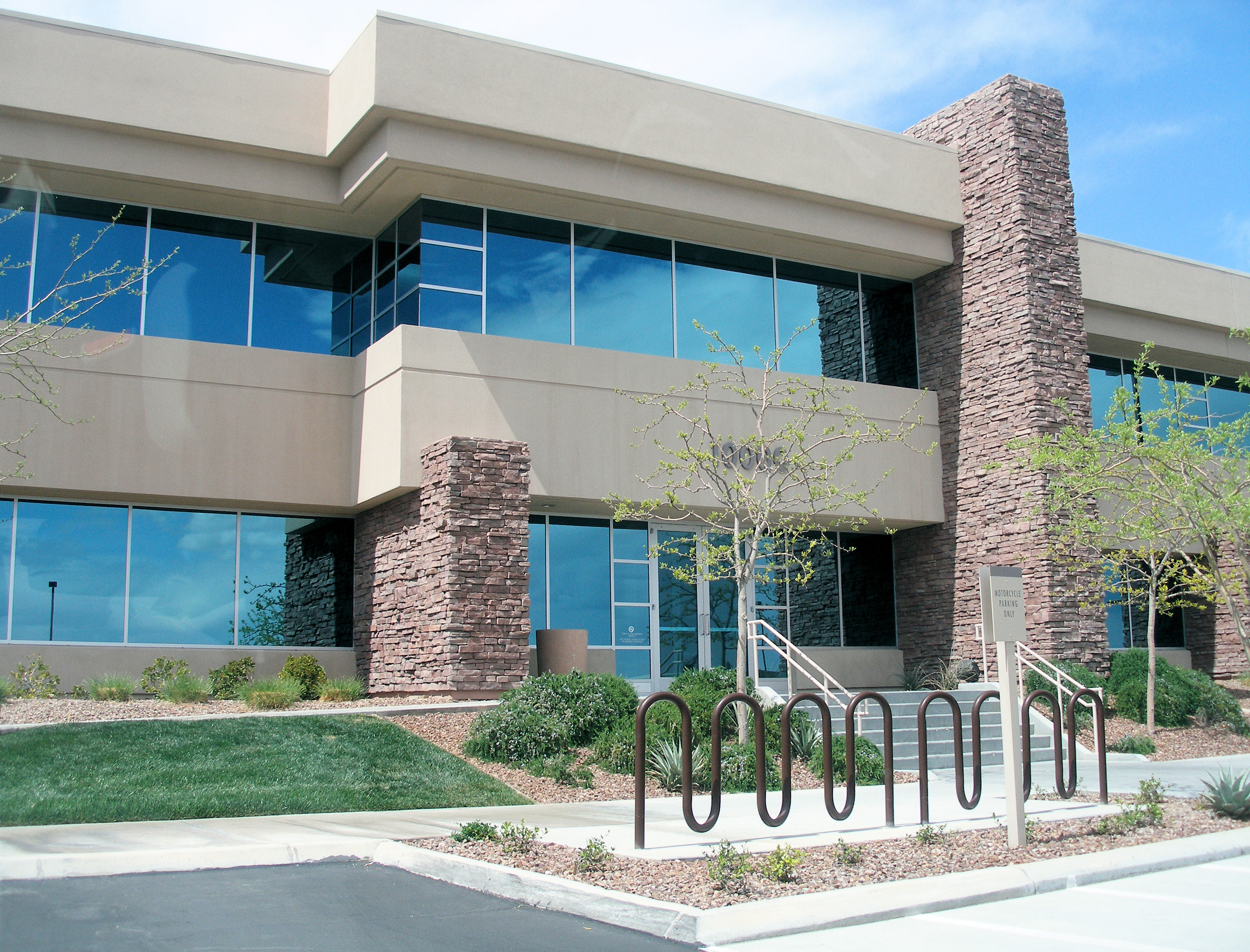
Summerlin and Howard Hughes Holdings headquarters

In 1990, Summerlin Parkway – a six-lane highway costing $22 million to complete, running from Rainbow Boulevard to Town Center Drive – was opened, connecting the new development to U.S. Route 95.

To mitigate environmental impact, Summa Corporation made a deal with the Bureau of Land Management in which they traded 5,000 acres (2,000 ha) of environmentally sensitive land for 3,000 acres (1,200 ha) acres of land better suited for development. After this environmental concern was addressed, development began.

By the end of 1990, the construction of its first residential area, park, and school had been completed.

In 1994, Summa Corporation rebranded itself as the Howard Hughes Corporation and continued to develop new areas of Summerlin.

Around 2008, the Great Recession led to a temporary slowdown in new construction within Summerlin.

After 2014, development activity increased significantly, highlighted by the opening of Downtown Summerlin, a 106-acre (43 ha) development featuring retail stores, restaurants, and entertainment venues.

== Demographics ==
It has a median household income of $72,078.

== Geography ==
The development covers 22,500 acres (9,100 ha) of the western edge of incorporated Las Vegas and sits at the center-west end of the Las Vegas Valley. Downtown Summerlin refers to the development's primary commercial and retail shopping area.

The neighborhood is adjacent to many wilderness conservation, recreation, and commercial areas, including Red Rock and Spring Mountains and to the west, the La Madre and Mount Charleston Wilderness areas to its northwest, and the Las Vegas Strip resort corridor to its east.

The majority of Summerlin is within Las Vegas Ward I, currently represented on the Las Vegas City Council by Brian Knudsen, mayor pro tempore. Along with many private and charter schools, public education is provided by the Clark County School District. Emergency services are provided by the Las Vegas Metropolitan Police Department and the Las Vegas Fire & Rescue department.

=== Climate ===
TPC Golf Course in Summerlin

Climate chart (precipitation, max. and min. temperature)
J	F	M	A	M	J	J	A	S	O	N	D
0.5 58 39	0.7 63 44	0.4 70 49	0.2 78 56	0.1 89 66	0.1 99 75	0.4 104 81	0.3 102 79	0.3 94 71	0.3 81 59	0.4 67 47	0.5 57 39
- █ Average max. and min. temperatures in °F
- █ Precipitation totals in inches
Metric conversion
J	F	M	A	M	J	J	A	S	O	N	D
13 14 4	18 17 7	10 21 9	5.1 26 13	2.5 32 19	2.5 37 24	10 40 27	7.6 39 26	7.6 34 22	7.6 27 15	10 19 8	13 14 4
- █ Average max. and min. temperatures in °C
- █ Precipitation totals in mm

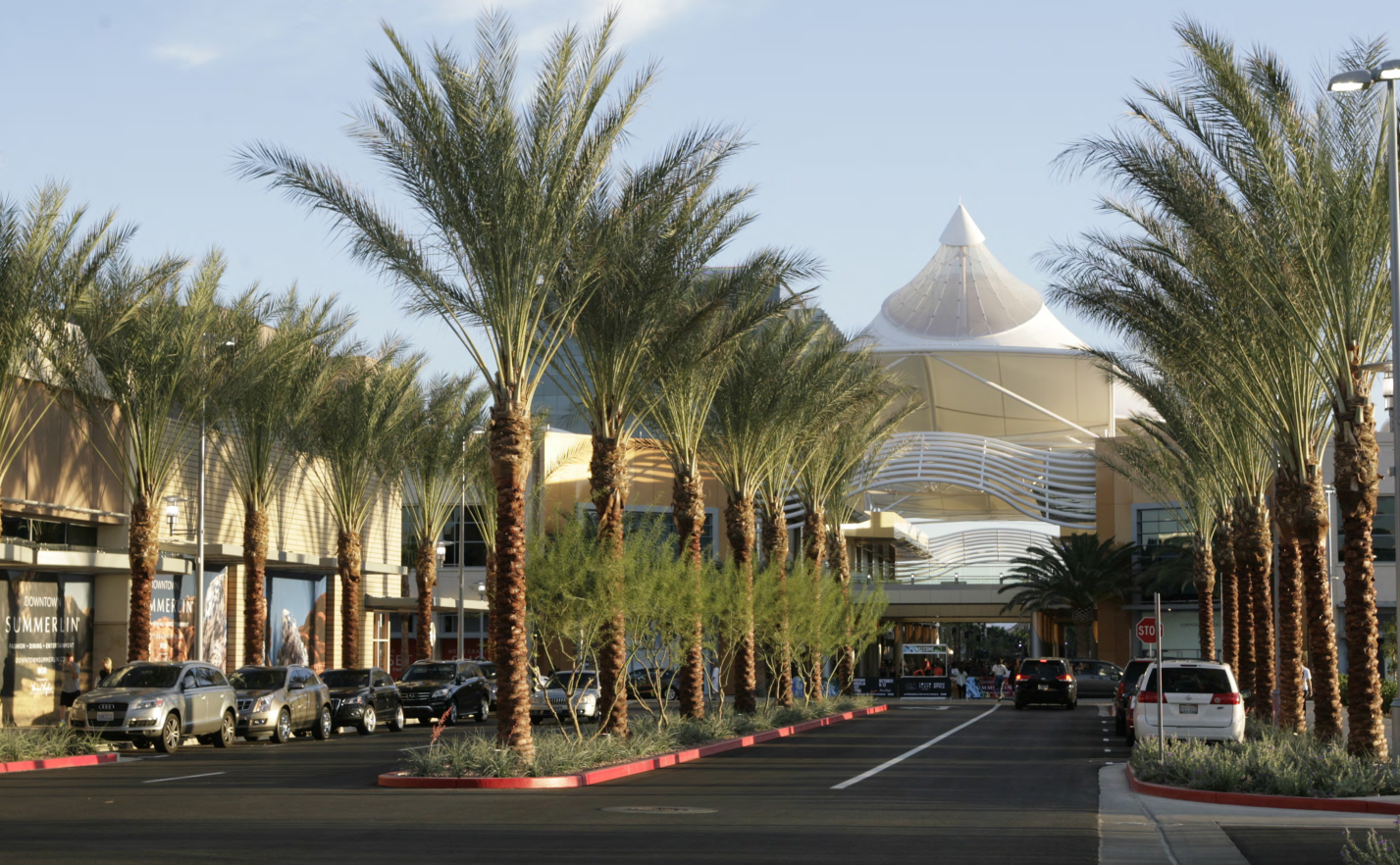
The main thoroughfare in Downtown Summerlin

Summerlin has a hot desert climate typical of the Mojave Desert in which it lies (Köppen climate classification: BWh).

Summers tend to be very hot and very dry, with daily highs often exceeding 100 °F (38 °C); temperatures as high as 118 °F (48 °C) have been observed. The spring and fall seasons are generally sunny, warm, and dry, with daily highs in the 70s and 80s Fahrenheit (20s and low 30s Celsius). Winters tend to be cool and windy, with daily highs in the 50s Fahrenheit (10s Celsius); temperatures seldom drop below freezing, and snowfall is rare, but some rain is common (especially in January and February).

== Economy ==
Allegiant Air has their corporate headquarters in Summerlin.

=== Hotel and casinos ===
Three major resort casinos are located in the Summerlin area:

- JW Marriott Las Vegas and the attached Rampart Casino opened together in 1999.
- Red Rock Casino, Resort & Spa opened in 2006.
- Suncoast Hotel and Casino opened in 2000 and is generally considered a Summerlin property, even though it is actually located just outside the community.

Summerlin has a non-gaming hotel called Element Las Vegas, which was developed by Westin Hotels. It opened in 2008.

== Arts and culture ==
=== Downtown Summerlin ===
Downtown Summerlin is a 400-acre (160 ha) mixed-use district. It opened in 2014, and includes a 106-acre (43 ha) shopping center with more than 125 shops, bars, and restaurants. It also features office and residential space. In addition, Downtown Summerlin also includes two sports facilities:

- City National Arena, opened in 2017. It serves as a practice facility for the Vegas Golden Knights NHL franchise and is also the home arena of the UNLV Rebels hockey program.

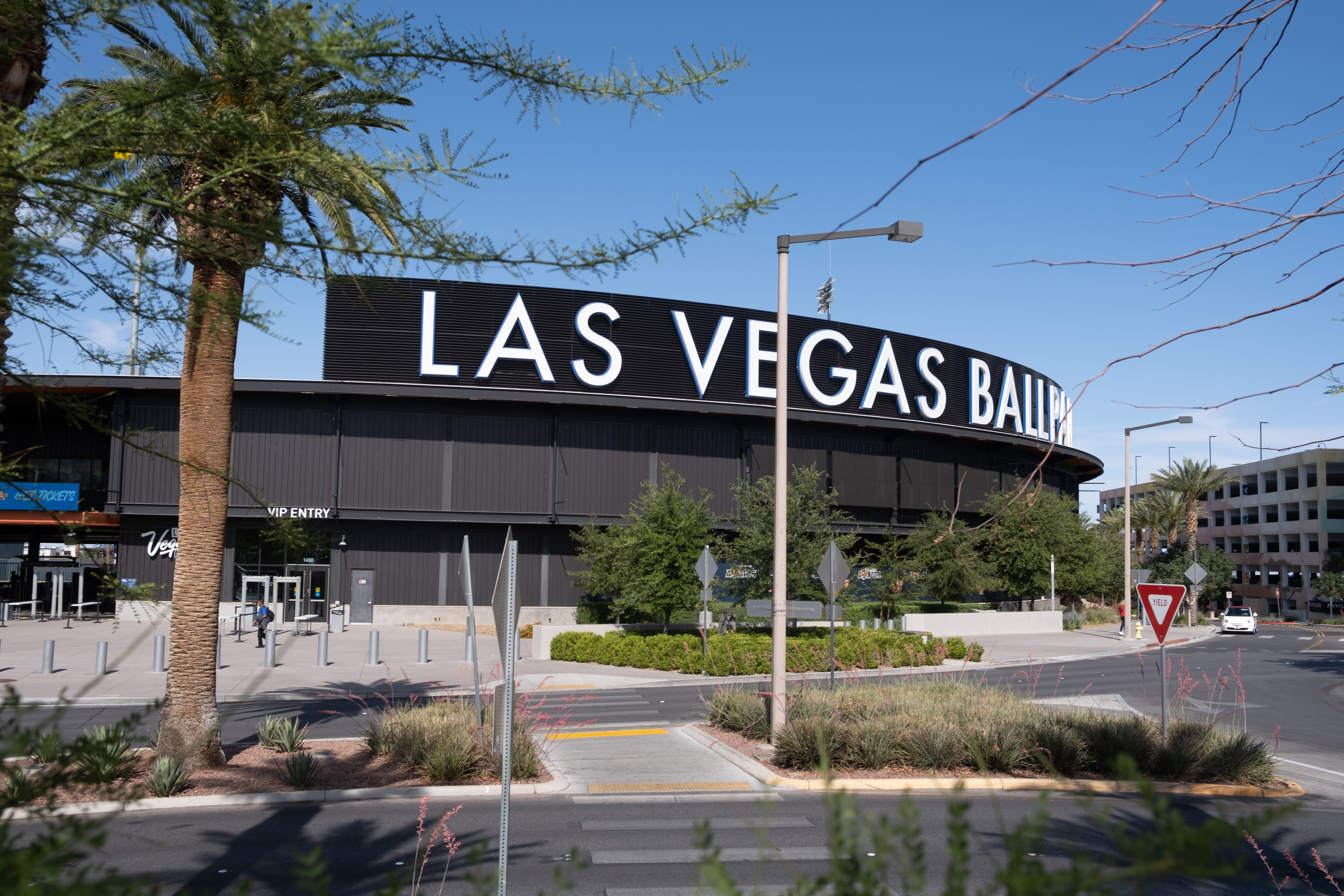
Las Vegas Ballpark

- Las Vegas Ballpark, opened in 2019 and home of the Las Vegas Aviators minor league baseball team.

Local events are held in Downtown Summerlin throughout the year, including an annual art festival, outdoor fitness classes, wine walks, holiday festivals, and visits from celebrity guest speakers.

=== Library ===
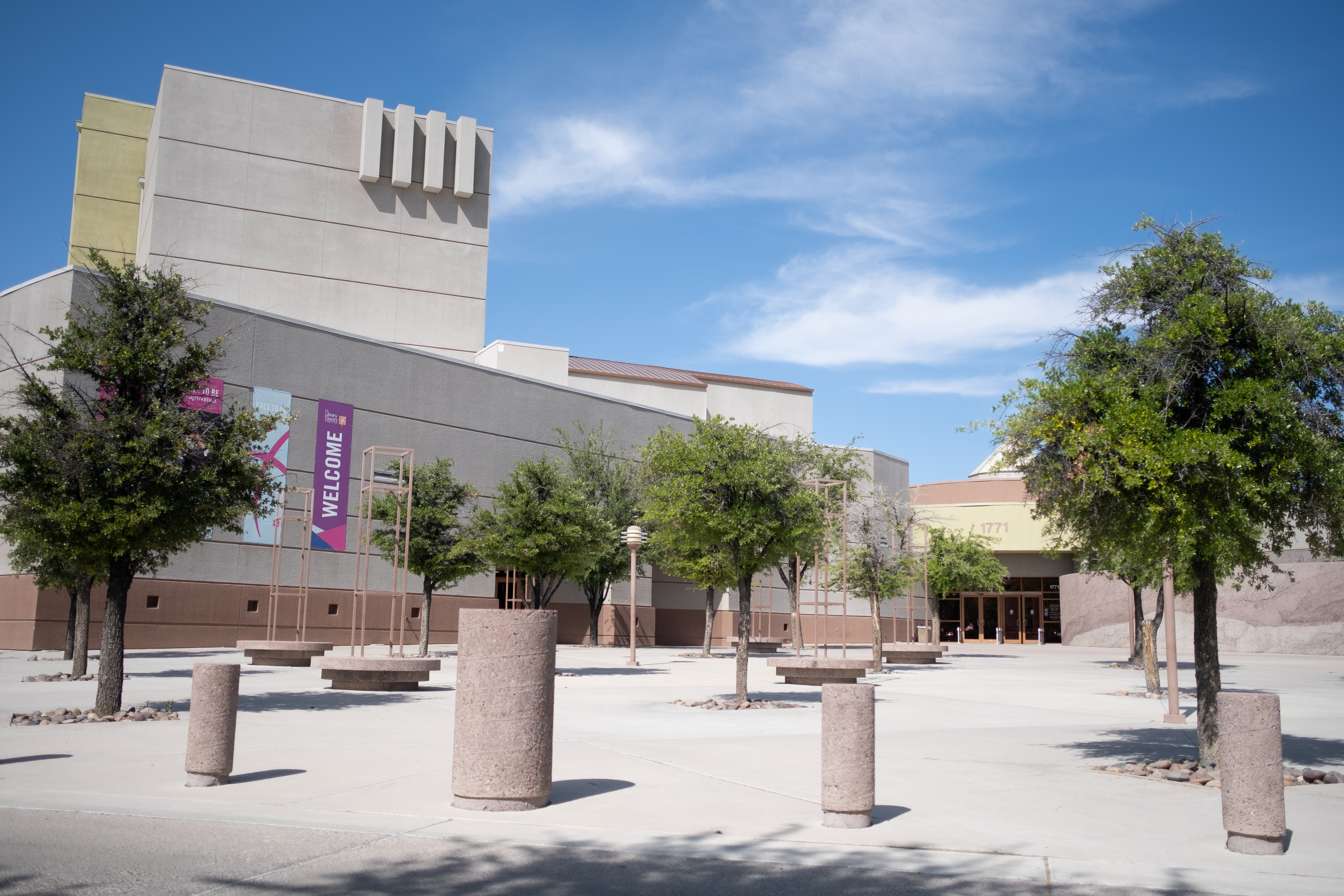
Summerlin Library

Summerlin has a public library, a branch of the Las Vegas-Clark County Library District.

== Sports ==
The city's NHL franchise, the Vegas Golden Knights, practice at City National Arena in Summerlin. The arena also offers skating lessons, hosts youth and adult amateur hockey leagues, and trains competitive figure skaters.

The UNLV Hockey team plays its home games at City National Arena in Summerlin.

The Las Vegas Aviators (a minor league baseball franchise) play at the Las Vegas Ballpark in Summerlin.

== Parks and recreation ==
=== Cycling ===
Bicycle lanes are provided on most major roads in Summerlin, as well as in the adjacent Red Rock Canyon National Conservation Area.

=== Community parks ===
Large community parks, which are available for free public use, are located throughout Summerlin. As of 2026, more than 300 parks feature a variety of recreational amenities, including community centers, barbecue areas, walking trails, playgrounds, swimming pools, interactive water features, soccer fields, baseball fields, football fields, basketball courts, tennis courts, volleyball courts, bocce ball and shuffleboard courts, and motorized toy areas. In addition, the parks with community centers typically offer special events, classes, and children's camps. Swimming pool access, sports field and court registration and league participation, facility rentals, and classes require a Summerlin identification card issued only to owners and tenants who live in an area governed by a Summerlin HOA.

In 2026, a portion of Grand Park, the largest park in Summerlin, opened to the public. Once the three phases are complete, Grand Park is expected to be around 90 acres (36 ha) within the master-planned community of Grand Park Village

=== Walking trails ===
As of 2018, the Summerlin Trail System was more than 150 miles (240 km) long, connecting local neighborhoods to various amenities throughout the community. The system includes five types of planned trails: street-side; village; bike; regional; and natural.

As of 2026, more than 200 miles (320 km) of interconnected trails connect to more than 2,000 miles (3,200 km) of regional trails, making it one of the most comprehensive and efficient trail systems in the southwestern United States.

In 2008, Summerlin and the Howard Hughes Corporation received the American Trails Developer Award, which is given to developers in recognition of "quality, well designed multi-use trails systems that are integrated into private developments".

=== Mountain recreation ===
The adjacent Red Rock Canyon National Conservation Area offers 26 hiking trails (ranging in difficulty from easy to strenuous). The canyon is also suitable for bouldering and rock climbing and has an overnight camp site.

== Education ==
=== Public schools ===
Public schools in Summerlin belong to the Clark County School District, which serves almost all of Southern Nevada.

=== Elementary schools located in Summerlin ===
- Shelley Berkley Elementary School
- John W. Bonner Elementary School
- Roger M. Bryan Elementary School
- Linda Rankin Givens Elementary School
- John & Judy Goolsby Elementary School
- William R. Lummis Elementary School
- D'vorre & Hal Ober Elementary School
- Ethel W. Staton Elementary School
- James B. McMillan Elementary
- Katz Elementary
- Bill and Rosemary Vassiliadis

=== Middle schools located in Summerlin ===
- Ernest Becker Middle School
- Victoria Fertitta Middle School
- Sig Rogich Middle School

=== High schools located in Summerlin ===
- Palo Verde High School
- Cimarron-Memorial High School
- West Career And Technical Academy

In addition to the above-listed public schools, some Summerlin residents are zoned for schools located just outside of the Summerlin boundaries proper. For example, many families in Summerlin South are zoned for Durango High School in nearby Spring Valley).

=== Private schools ===
Summerlin has a number of private schools, including:

- The Adelson Educational Campus (K-12; Jewish)
- Alexander Dawson School (K-8; Secular)
- Bishop Gorman High School (9-12; Catholic)
- Faith Lutheran Academy (K-5; Lutheran)
- Faith Lutheran Jr/Sr High School (6-12; Lutheran)
- The Meadows School (K-12; Secular)
- Merryhill Preschools (Infants-Pre-K)
- Merryhill School (K-5; Secular)
- St. Elizabeth Ann Seton Catholic School (K-8; Catholic)
- The Shenker Academy (Kindergarten only; Jewish)
- Sholom Schechter Day School of Las Vegas (K-5; Jewish)

=== Higher education ===
Higher education within the community of Summerlin is mostly limited to small satellite campuses, including:

- The College of Southern Nevada (Summerlin Center Campus; Public)
- The Roseman University of Health Sciences (Summerlin Campus; Private)

Note that Summerlin is located within 10 miles (16 km) of the College of Southern Nevada's main campus (CSN - Charleston), within 20 miles (32 km) of the University of Nevada, Las Vegas (UNLV), and within 30 miles (48 km) of Nevada State College (NSC).

== Infrastructure ==
=== Governance ===
In addition to local government (either the City of Las Vegas or Clark County depending on jurisdiction), Summerlin is divided into community associations covering the north, south, west, and center, as well as separate community associations for Sun City Summerlin and the two gated country club developments (Siena and Red Red Country Club). Homeowners and business owners contribute into each community association through monthly dues. The four main community associations contribute into and send representatives to the Summerlin Council, which is the owner and operator of the community centers and adjoining parks, swimming pools, and sports facilities in the community. In addition, individual villages or townhome developments may have their own homeowners associations to govern their neighborhoods. Properties are also in a special improvement district to pay for public infrastructure, which is assessed annually as a bond payment.

=== Healthcare ===
The Summerlin Hospital Medical Center, a private hospital operated by the Valley Health System, provides 485 beds to the local community. It is an accredited Chest Pain Center and Primary Stroke Center. Other features include: the Children's Medical Center, the Breast Care Center, the Cancer Center, the Rehab Center, and the Robotic Surgery Center. Its 40-acre (16 ha) campus is located in The Crossings village of Summerlin North.

== Notable people ==
- Miriam Adelson: Chairman and CEO of Las Vegas Sands
- Andre Agassi: Professional tennis player
- Eugenie Bouchard: Professional tennis player
- David Copperfield: Magician and TV personality
- Frank Fertitta III: CEO of Station Casinos
- Russ Freeman (pianist): Bebop jazz pianist and composer
- Joey Gallo: MLB player for the New York Yankees
- Steffi Graf: Professional tennis player
- Rick Harrison: Owner of World Famous Gold & Silver Pawn Shop and Pawn Stars Reality TV Star
- Brandon Marshall: Former NFL wide receiver for the Denver Broncos and Oakland Raiders
- Bob Miller: Former Nevada Governor
- Ross Miller: Former Nevada Secretary of State
- Michael Morton: Founder of the Morton Group of restaurants
- Asia Muhammad: WTA Tennis player
- Shabazz Muhammad: NBA player for the Minnesota Timberwolves
- DeMarco Murray: Former NFL running back for the Tennessee Titans and Dallas Cowboys
- Joey Rickard: MLB player for the San Francisco Giants
- O. J. Simpson: Former NFL player, convicted felon, actor, and sportscaster
- Ronnie Stanley: NFL Offensive Tackle for the Baltimore Ravens
- Brendon Urie: Vocalist for Panic! at the Disco
- Mark Wahlberg: Actor and entrepreneur
- C.J. Watson: NBA basketball player for the Orlando Magic
- Dana White: President of Ultimate Fighting Championship
- Pia Zadora: Actress and singer
- Stephen Zimmerman: NBA player for the Orlando Magic
