= Girard B. Henderson =

American business executive (1905–1983)

Jerry Henderson
- Born: Girard B. Henderson; February 25, 1905; Brooklyn, New York, US
- Died: November 16, 1983 (aged 78); Las Vegas, Nevada, US
- Occupations: Businessman, philanthropist
- Title: Founder and CEO, Alexander Dawson Foundation; CEO, Alexander Dawson Inc.
- Board member of: Avon Products
- Spouses: Theodora G. Huntington; Mary Franklin
- Children: 2
- Father: Alexander D. Henderson

Girard B. "Jerry" Henderson (February 25, 1905 – November 16, 1983) was an American business man and philanthropist. He was a director of Avon Products and the founder of the Alexander Dawson Schools. The author Donald Porter described him as a "short, tough-talking millionaire".

== Early life ==
Henderson is the son of Alexander Dawson Henderson, one of the co-initiators of what would become Avon Products.

He married Theodora G. Henderson. In January 1955, they entered a separation agreement working towards a divorce. They had two daughters. On June 5, 1964, Henderson married his second wife, Mary Hollingsworth (1905–1988) in Clark County, Nevada.

== Career ==
Henderson flew a Beechcraft Model 17 Staggerwing biplane to transport wealthy business executives. In 1933, Henderson opened the Henderson Motor Co., a Chrysler Dodge dealership in Suffern, New York, with Kenneth Burnham. Henderson later landed a contract to truck materials for Avon from New York City to Suffern. The McConnells rewarded Henderson by selling him shares in Avon at 1 cent per share. By 1973, his share value had increased to $135 million, at which time he told Forbes he had no intention of selling.

In 1940, Henderson was elected to serve on the Board of Directors for Avon Products. He remained on the board for 35 years.

In 1950, Henderson created the Alarm Corporation in Carmel, California. The company provided underground cable service to Monterey Peninsula communities. The company had its receiving antenna site on the high ground of Pebble Beach.

The A. D. Henderson Foundation was founded in 1959 by Henderson and his wife, Lucy, with the mission of "creating and developing constructive links between the public and private sectors of society.

In 1966, Time magazine published a story that revealed Henderson's interests in half a dozen businesses, and that he owned 1,035,410 shares of Avon stock.

Henderson owned a majority stake in a company called Underground World Homes. In 1964, he sponsored the Underground World Home exhibit at the New York World's Fair. In addition to the underground home, there was also an exhibit sponsored by Henderson called "Why Live Underground?" At the height of the Cold War and fearing nuclear war or other catastrophe, Henderson built and lived in underground homes in Colorado and Las Vegas, Nevada.

In 1978, architect Jay Swayze designed and built for Henderson a large underground house in Las Vegas, that included a swimming pool and putting green surrounded by pastel murals.

=== Alexander Dawson Foundation ===
In 1957, Henderson formed the Alexander Dawson Foundation.

In 1980, he created the Colorado Junior Republic School (CJR) on a 380-acre site near Lafayette, Colorado, as a boarding school for children who otherwise wouldn't have an opportunity for an education.

== Death ==
On November 16, 1983, Henderson died of a heart attack. He is buried near Beaufort, South Carolina.
