= Dawson School (Colorado) =

Private school in Colorado, US

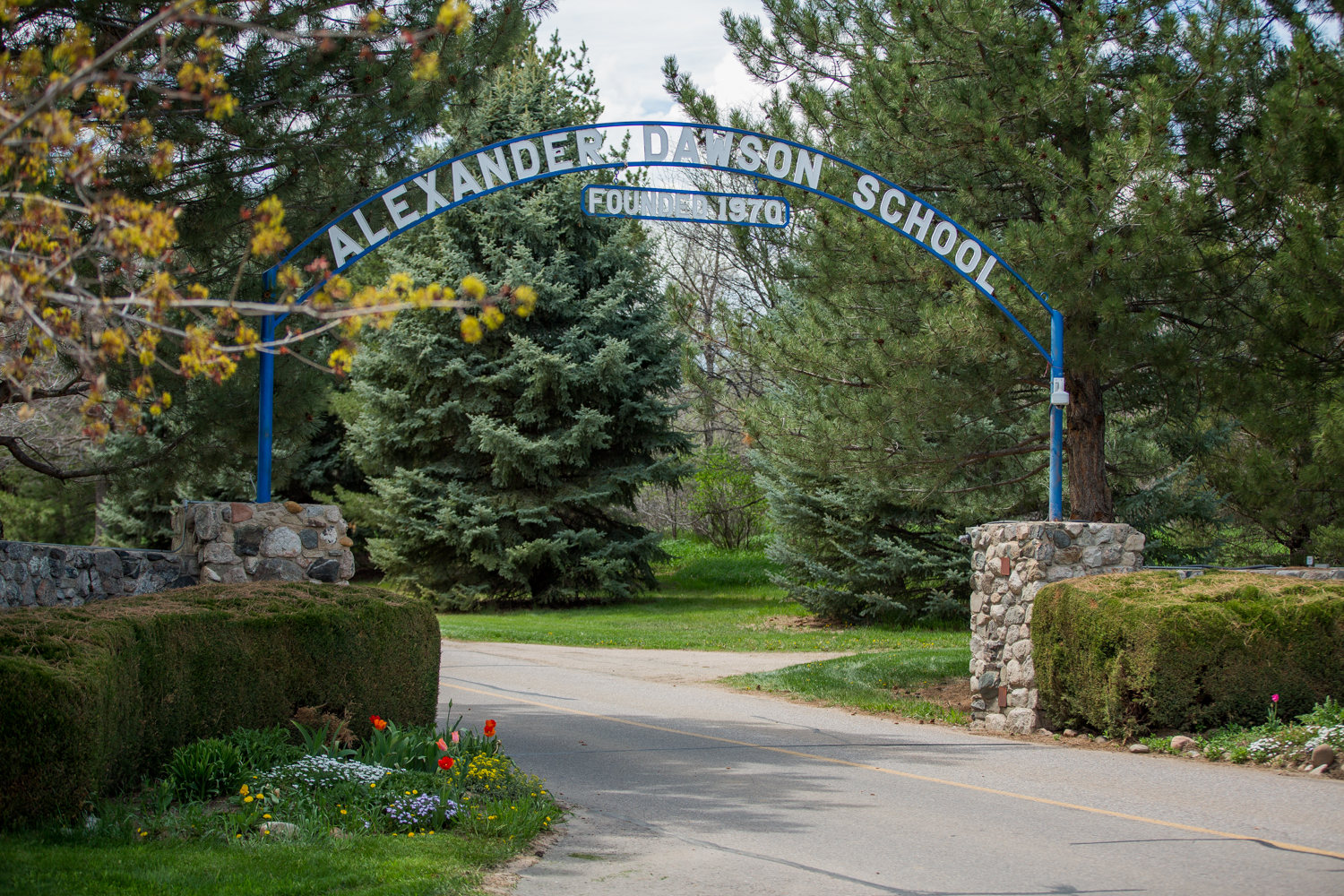

Location
- 10455 Dawson Drive; Lafayette, Colorado 80026; United States
- 40°3′47″N 105°6′39″W

Information
- Type: Independent, Day school
- Motto: Nothing Without Labor
- Established: 1970 (56 years ago)
- CEEB code: 060867
- Head teacher: George P. Moore
- Enrollment: 520
- Average class size: 15 students
- Student to teacher ratio: 7:1
- Campus type: Suburban
- Colors: Blue and white
- Athletics: 13 sports
- Mascot: Mustang
- Website: www.dawsonschool.org

Dawson School is an independent, private, co-educational, college preparatory day school founded in 1970. Located in Lafayette, Colorado, United States. The school serves children from kindergarten through twelfth grade (K–12) in Lower, Middle, and Upper School on a campus of 107 acres (430,000 m^{2}).

== History ==
In 1967, Girard B. Henderson established the Colorado Junior Republic (CJR) School at Stapp Lakes, Colorado. The school started as a summer school for underprivileged children. In 1970, it expanded into a year-round school, and then converted to a college preparatory program.

=== Early years ===
In 1970, the school moved to Lafayette, Colorado, where construction began on several new buildings. An industrious student body, "citizens" attended class, worked the farm and ranch, prepared meals, built structures, flew airplanes, and ran athletic and theatrical programs.

In 1980, the school changed its name to Alexander Dawson School in honor of Henderson's father, Alexander Dawson Henderson. Responding to increasing demand for a rigorous academic program, the school developed into a college preparatory independent school.

In the 1990s, the school grew from 26 students in grades 7–12 to a population of 386, grades K-12, and was now an independent day school. The school introduced the concept of community service or service-learning when it began and became a hot education topic where it is a graduation requirement. Bill Clinton adopted the idea as one of the key reforms for improving American schools.

=== 2000–present ===
On September 6, 2000, the Alexander Dawson Foundation opened a sister school in the Summerlin, Nevada. The Alexander Dawson School at Rainbow Mountain is an independent, day school with over 150 students from kindergarten through fifth grade.

=== 2021 Sex Abuse Scandal ===
In 2021, a music teacher at Dawson School was arrested and charged on multiple class 4 felony counts of sexual assault of a child by one in a position of trust, and misdemeanor unlawful sexual contact. The victims ranged in age from 17 to 19 and were all students at Dawson School. The victims reported the crimes all occurred on school property during normal school operating hours. The teacher was ultimately convicted and sentenced to prison for these crimes. The Boulder Deputy District Attorney M. Breck Roesch was quoted as noting the teacher "had been fired from a school in California and a camp in Oregon for similar behavior prior to his arrival at Dawson."

A civil lawsuit was filed against Dawson School on behalf of the victims. The lawsuit alleges "the school failed to conduct due diligence in hiring its staff and instead hired a sexual predator who had just been accused of sexual misconduct at another elite private school. What is more, the school failed to heed the concerns voiced by its own staff related to the teacher’s clear grooming behavior—concerns that were raised at the very beginning of the school year," and further details "the school’s callous disregard for the safety and well-being of its students—which appears to fit a long-standing pattern of covering up and minimizing sexual assault on its campus and marginalizing the victims of those assaults."

A task force was formed in 2022 of parents, former students and staff. The task force reported uncovering "about 20 reports from parents, faculty and alumni detailing sexual misconduct incidents that took place in the past five years," including a reported "five more additional faculty members accused of sexual assault or misconduct who 'have quietly departed Dawson without any third-party investigations and without parents having been informed.'"

=== Today's campus ===
Dawson's 107-acre (430,000 m^{2}) campus includes an Upper School, a Middle School, and a Lower School. The Athletic Center contains two gyms and a conditioning facility; The Arts Center includes a theater, dance studio, band room, and fine arts studios. In 2018, the first new construction in 20 years was seen with the opening of the Dining Commons, a multi-purpose space for dining, meetings, and events. In 2010, the previous dining space was repurposed into the Learning Commons, and an updated library/student center was added. In 2020, the Dawson School Center for Innovation opened, a 24,500 acres (9,900 ha) building with classrooms, labs, maker space, and flexible spaces. The campus also includes cottages with classrooms, tennis courts, baseball fields, soccer and lacrosse fields, a swimming pool, learning gardens, a gymnasium, and an orchard.

== Special programs ==
=== Summer camps ===
Dawson School offers summer camps, with more than 100 camps taking place on campus over eight weeks.

== Governance and accreditation ==
Dawson School is accredited by the ACIS (Association of Colorado Independent Schools); they are also a member of CASE (Council for Advancement and Support of Education), ISM (Independent School Management), and NAIS (National Association of Independent Schools).

== Publications ==
- Alexander Dawson School, Nothing Without Labor and Love of the Land, Alexander Dawson School, Lafayette, Colorado, 2012
- The Hub, The Colorado Junior Republic, Volume 2, 1973–1974
- Add A Fourth "R"...Responsibility, Colorado Junior Republic School, Lafayette, Colorado, ca. 1973
