= Chicago Outlaws =

Box lacrosse team in Illinois, United States

- Founded: 2011
- League: Box Lacrosse League
- Based in: Palatine, Illinois
- Arena: Salt Creek Sports Center
- Colors: Aqua, black
- Owner: Ray Kincaid
- President: Ray Kincaid
- Head coach: A.J. Collier II
- General manager: A.J. Collier II
- Championships: 1
- Local media: Arena Sports Network
- Website: www.chicagooutlaws.net

The Chicago Outlaws are a senior semi-professional box lacrosse team in the Box Lacrosse League. The Outlaws presently play at the Salt Creek Sports Center in Palatine, Illinois.

== History ==
Formed in 2011, the Chicago Outlaws are one of four original members of the Box Lacrosse League, (originally named Midwest Lacrosse Alliance and later Midwest Indoor Lacrosse Association and Continental Indoor Lacrosse League), a men's senior box lacrosse league in the United States.

Chicago finished runner-up in two of their first three seasons, falling short in the 2011 and 2013 league championship game.

In 2014, the Outlaws finished an 8–1 regular season and went on to win their first CILL Cup.

One notable player for the Outlaws was Zack Dorn, who set the world record for fastest shot (116 mph) at the 2014 Major League Lacrosse All-Star Game.

== Season-by-season record ==
Season	W	L	League Finish	Playoffs
2011	3	3	3rd	Finalist (lost to Grand Rapids)
2012	4	2	5th	Semifinalist (lost to Colorado Sabertooths)
2013	5	1	2nd	Finalist (lost to Colorado Sabertooths)
2014	7	1	1st	CILL Cup champion (def. Grand Rapids)
