= The Alexander Dawson School at Rainbow Mountain =

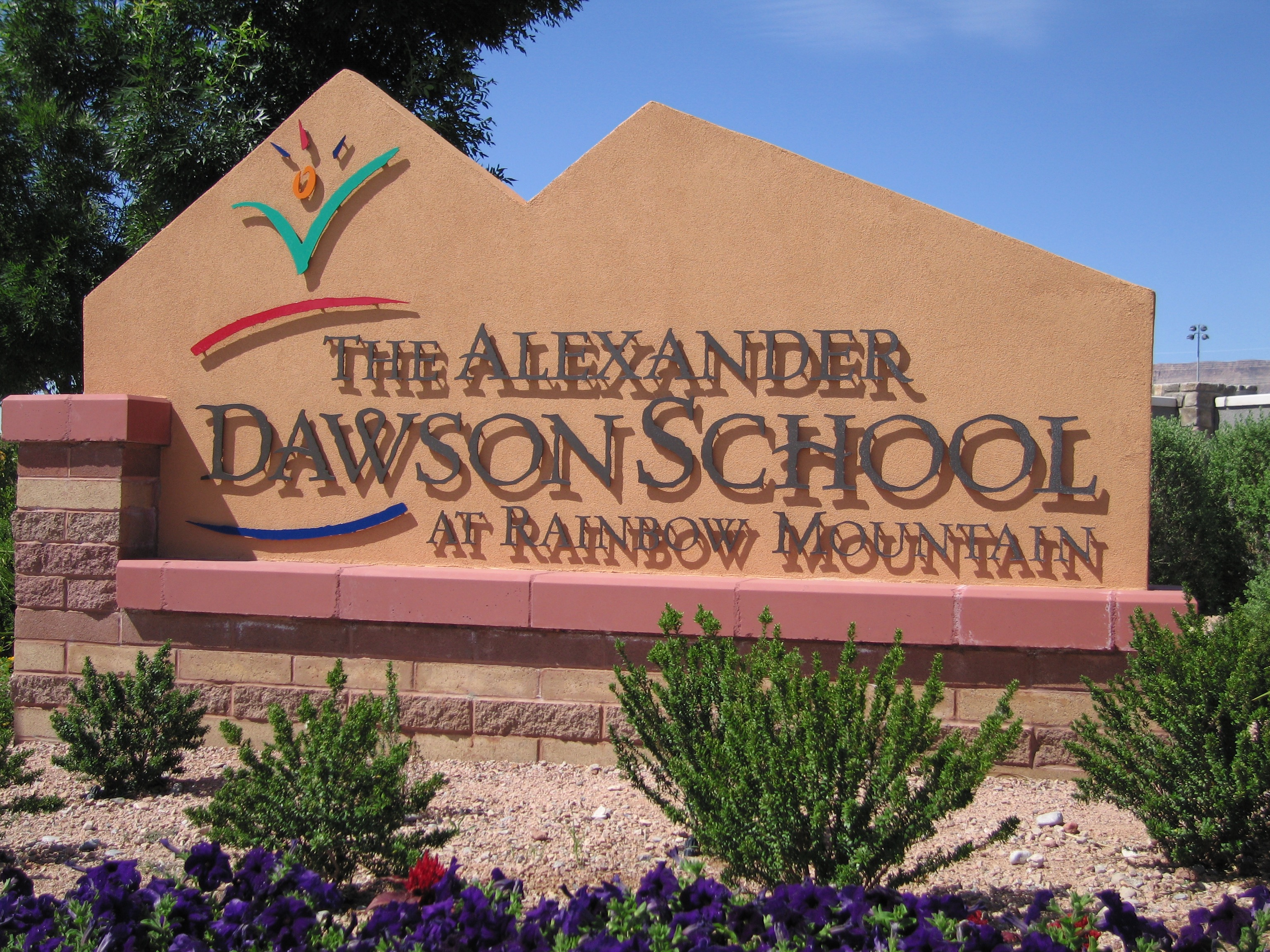

Location
- Summerlin, Nevada; United States; 36.12672981549812°N 115.33082845998223°W

Information
- Type: Independent Day school
- Established: September 2000
- Head of School: Roxanne Stansbury
- Faculty: 115
- Enrollment: 520
- Student to teacher ratio: 8:1
- Campus: 33 acres (13 ha) in Summerlin
- Colors: Navy and Red
- Athletics: 8 sports
- Mascot: Bear
- Website: https://www.alexanderdawsonschool.org

The Alexander Dawson School at Rainbow Mountain or Dawson is a private independent, college-preparatory, and day school in Summerlin, Nevada. The Alexander Dawson School at Rainbow Mountain provides co-educational and secular education to over 520 students from preschool through eighth grade.

== History ==
In 1996, the Alexander Dawson Foundation decided to open a school in the Las Vegas Valley, the Foundation's home for more than 30 years. Located on a 33-acre (13 ha) campus in Summerlin, the Alexander Dawson Foundation spent $58 million for the land, the school facilities, the interest expenses on the construction bonds, and in shortfall budget support during the school's early years. Ground was broken in 1999, and The Alexander Dawson School at Rainbow Mountain opened on September 6, 2000, with over 150 students from kindergarten through fifth grade. From 2001 to 2003, the school expanded by adding sixth, seventh and eighth grades to the curriculum. A three-year-old preschool curriculum was added in 2009, and enrollment had grown to over 630 students. The cost of tuition for the 2026-27 school year is $23,200 for early childhoood and $32,500 for kindergarten through eighth grade.

The school has an overall 8:1 student-to-faculty ratio. The school offers Spanish language education in kindergarten through fourth grade, and three languages in Middle School (Spanish, French, and Mandarin). The school offers boys' and girls' basketball, volleyball, flag football, track and field, cross-country, baseball, golf, and soccer through the Red Rock Athletic Conference.

As of March 2026, the school is the subject of a lawsuit filed by the family of a student that had been sexually assaulted by other students while on a field trip. Two of the assailants are being tried as adults. According to the lawsuit, the school leaders had previously ignored multiple complaints of bullying and blamed the victim for the assault.

== Alexander Dawson Foundation ==
The Alexander Dawson Foundation is a 501(c)(3) charity based in Paradise, Nevada. The foundation supports two schools: the Alexander Dawson School at Rainbow Mountain and the Dawson School in Lafayette, Colorado.
