= Earthship Brighton =

Sustainable building in Brighton, England

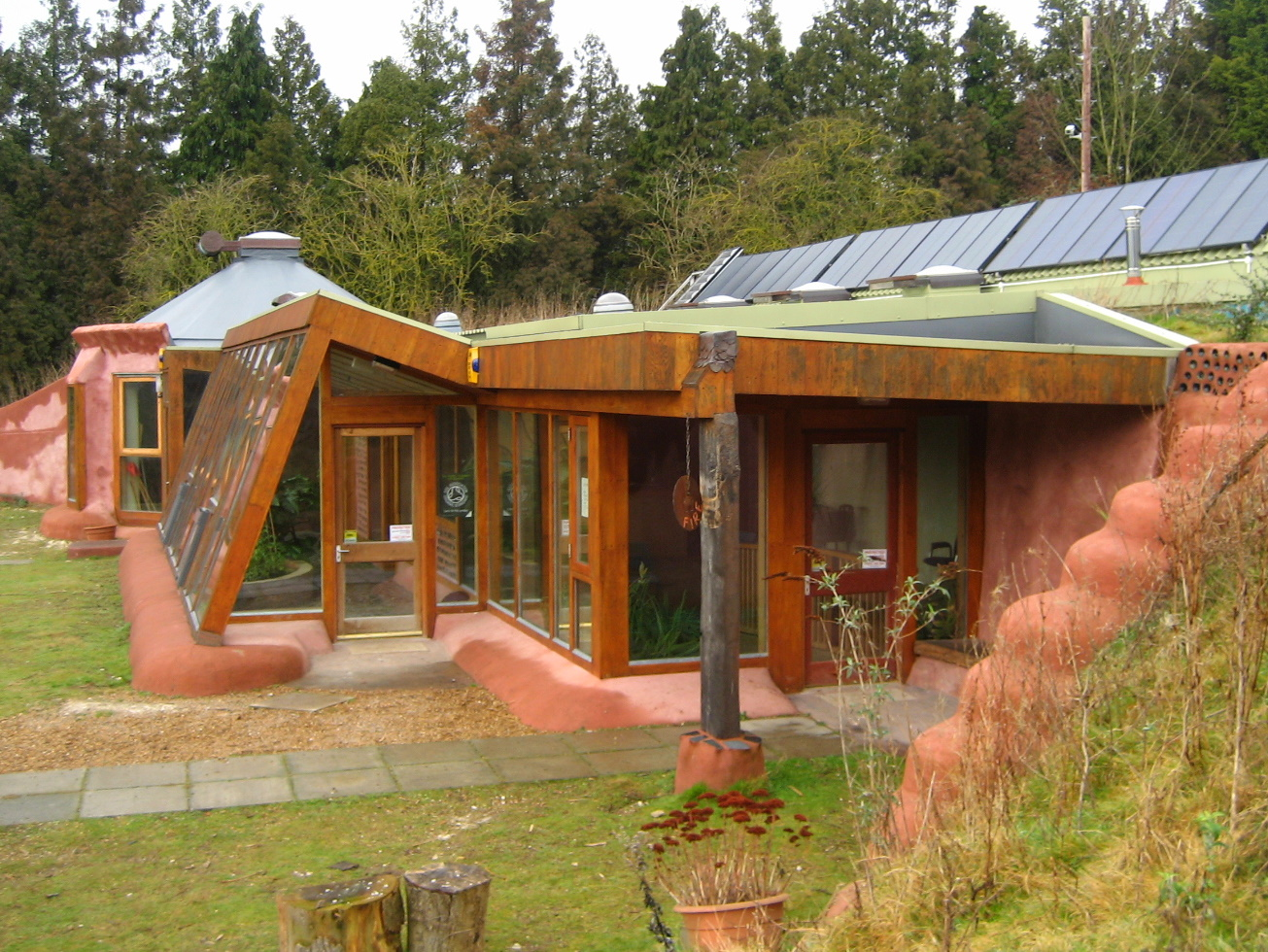
Earthship Brighton

Earthship Brighton is a self-sustainable building, completed in 2006 and owned by the non-profit Low Carbon Trust, situated in Stanmer Park, Brighton, England.

The building is an example of passive solar earth-sheltered design and was constructed using waste car tyres and other recycled materials such as cans and bottles. The structure incorporates rammed earth tyres, renewable power systems and rainwater harvesting. It uses the planet's natural systems to provide heat, power and water and is designed to work as an autonomous building.

== History ==
The Low Carbon Network, later renamed the Low Carbon Trust, was responsible for the construction of Earthship Brighton. Alex Leeor, one of the original co-directors of the Low Carbon Network, played a key role in securing funding for the project and contributing to its initial work. The structure had difficulty receiving planning permission, and a condition for its construction was that damp membranes had to be installed. The use of tyres packed with earth for its construction was controversial since there were no protocols in place, but these requirements were waved on an experimental basis.

The Low Carbon Trust crew were trained by Mike Reynolds, who designed the Earthship structure and is the founder of Earthship Biotecture. Earthship Brighton is currently one of only two Earthships in the UK and was the first Earthship to be built in England.

Earthship Brighton is used as a community and environmental education centre, with regular guided tours for the public. It is used as a venue for various green building courses, including a three-day course on 'Self-building an Earthship'.

In 2007, a book was written about the project: Earthships: building a zero carbon future for homes. A second edition, Earthships in Europe, was published in 2012, with case studies of earthships in France, Spain, and the UK. There is also an in-depth analysis of the thermal performance of the earthship in a temperate climate.

== Awards ==
Earthship Brighton has won ten awards and commendations. These include:

- South East Renewable Sustainable Energy Awards 2005 in the field of Innovation - Winner
- Environment Agency’s Water Efficiency Awards 2006 - Winner
- Sustain Magazine’s Construction and Renovation category; DfES category 2006;
- Green Apple Awards 2007 for the Built Environment and Architectural Heritage – National Gold Winner in the New Build Tourism category;
- Green Apple Awards 2007 – National Gold Winner for Business;
- South East Low Carbon Awards 2007 – Highly commended in the Low Carbon Development of the Year category
- National Energy Efficiency Awards 2007 – Highly commended in the Construction & Renovation category
- The Argus Eco Award 2010 – Winner of Greenest Building in Sussex
