= Tin can wall =

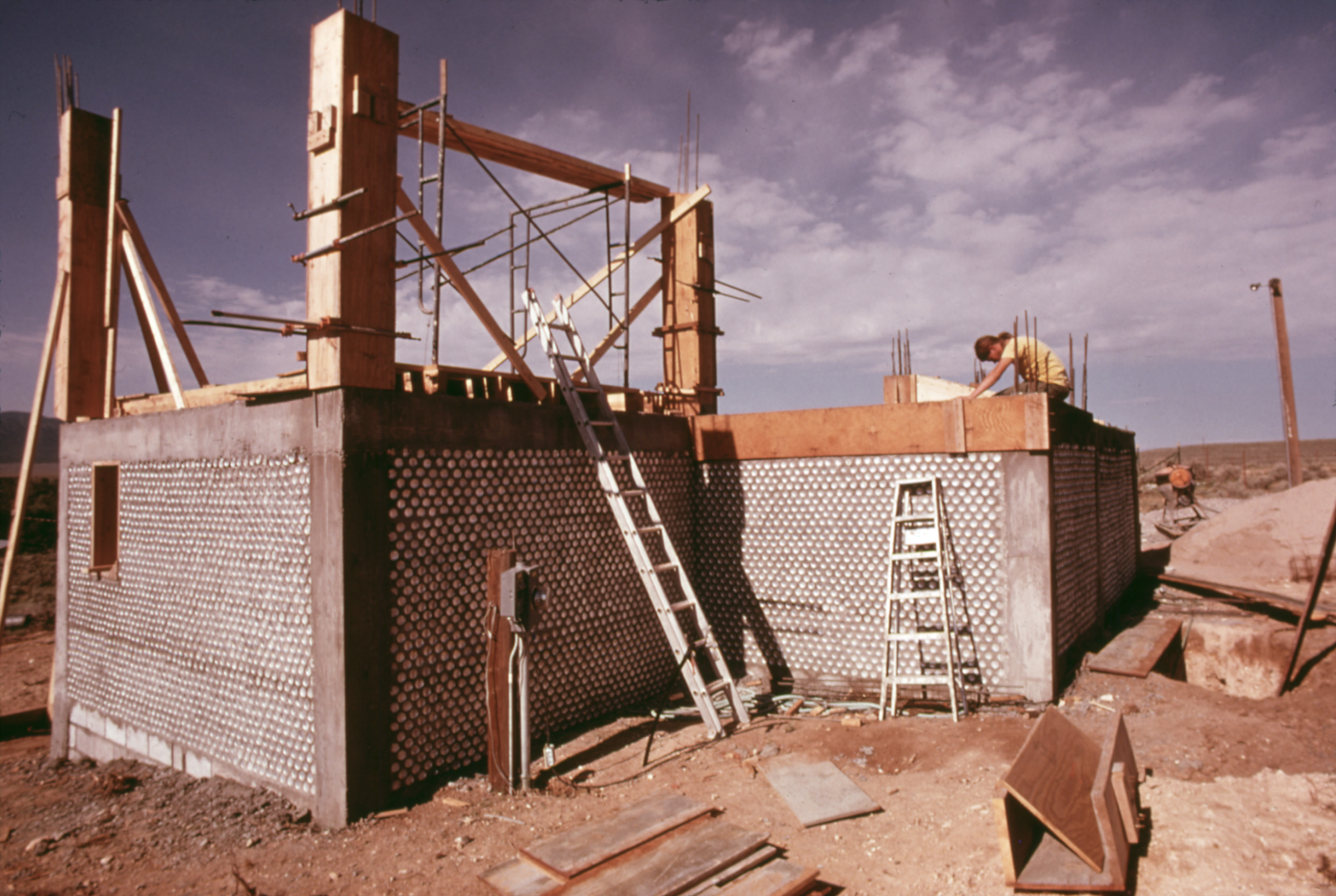
A building being built using beer cans as bricks

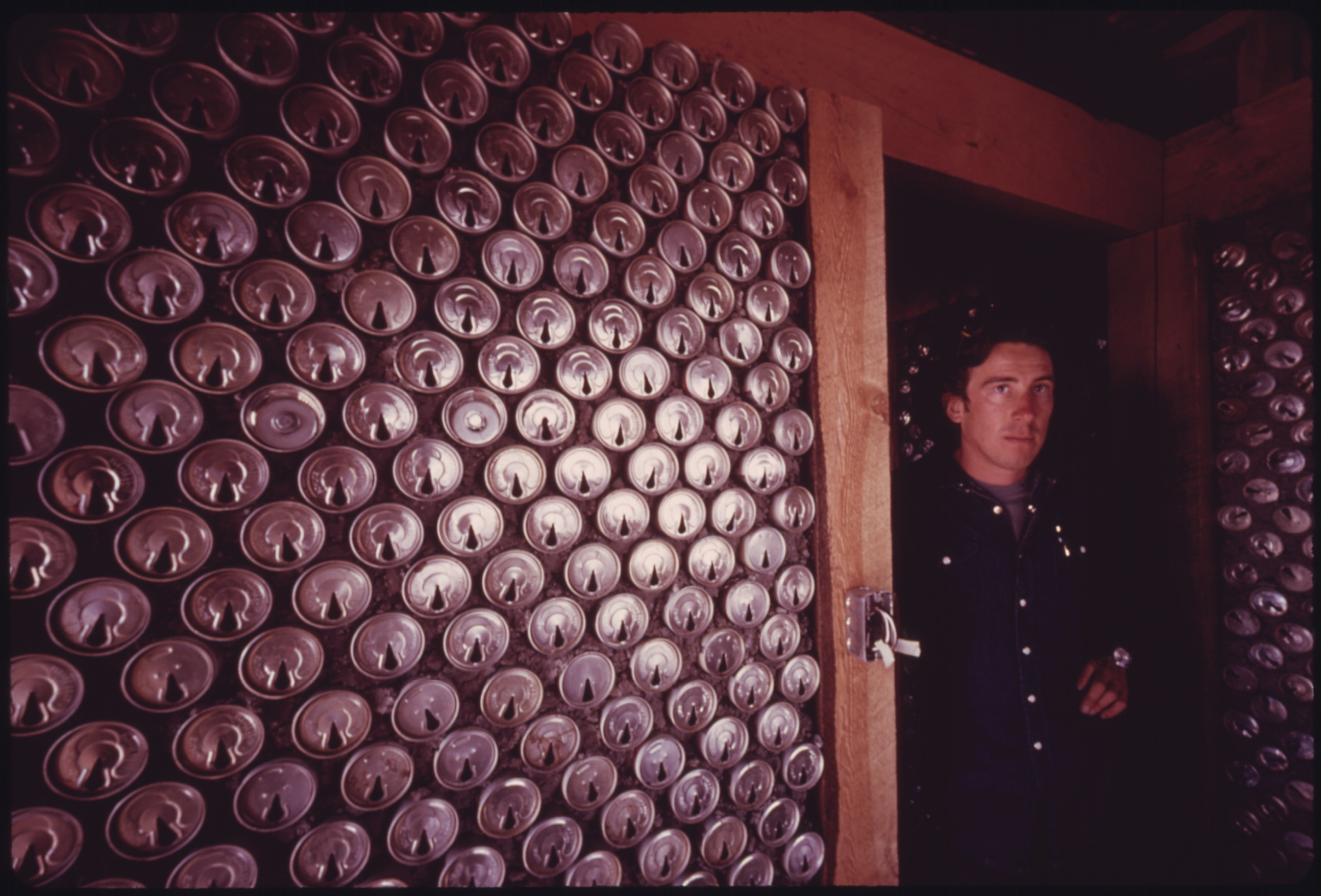
Architect Mike Reynolds next to a tin can wall in the 1970s

A tin can wall is a wall constructed from tin cans, which are not a common building source. The cans can be laid in concrete, stacked vertically on top of each other, and crushed or cut and flattened to be used as shingles. They can also be used for furniture.

Tin cans can form the actual fill-in structure (or walls) of a building, as is done with earthships. Tin cans have not been around for a long time, and neither have their building methods. The two main structural methods for building with tin cans are by laying them horizontally in a concrete matrix and by stacking them vertically.

== History ==
Tin can building in New Mexico originated in the early 1980s as a response to the massive amounts of trash being discarded and the wasteful nature of common building practices. Tin can construction was an attempt to utilize a readily available resource that was normally sent to landfills or recycling centers. This led to various experiments in tin can building, including space-filler between wooden frames in traditional house styles and creating domes and archways using cans and cement. Over time, more simplified and practical methods were developed, such as the earthship tin can wall. The main person behind these efforts was Mike Reynolds, also the creator of the earthship building method.

== Construction ==
A “traditional” earthship tin can wall is made by horizontally stacking tin cans in a concrete matrix. The cans are laid side by side and in alternating rows, similar to bricks. This is done simply and efficiently, using batches of concrete between the cans. The consistency of the concrete must be relatively thick, so as to hold its form and the tin cans in place. A surprisingly large number of cans are required.

The method for stacking the cans involves creating a row of cans separated by hand-formed “lumps” of concrete. The layout of a row is can, concrete, can, etc. This is then repeated, except that the alternating pattern is reversed, so that every can is laid on top of a concrete “lump” below it. This continues until completed, or the weight of the wall and the hardness of the cement seem questionable in terms of solidity. At that point it would be wise to wait for the wall to harden, but the laying time for cans and concrete is such that by the time a builder makes it back to an area that was recently laid it has had time to set. It is a judgment call as to whether or not the builder should continue, but by the next day or even later on the same day building can resume.

== Materials ==
The materials that go into a tin can wall are simple: mainly tin cans and concrete. Tin cans (now aluminum cans as real tin cans are not as readily available) can be acquired from any recycling center or a local bar. Brick mortar may also be used instead of cement.

== Coating ==
Once the wall is completed, the cans and the concrete are covered with a layer of cement or adobe mud mixture. What is applied depends on the location of the wall; if it is located in an area where it will be exposed to water (such as in a bathroom or utility room) it will need to be coated with a concrete layer. If it is located in a living room or bedroom, it can be covered with adobe plaster. A tin can wall that has half of its structure outside (such as the wall of an entrance to a building) will be coated with cement on the outside and adobe on the inside. The shape of the cans (their pull-tabs, etc.) and the roughness of the cement will provide a lath-like surface for the cement or adobe to stick to.

This initial layer is “screeded” (scratched with a tool that creates a ridge-like pattern thereby making it easier to apply another coat) and a second layer is added. More layers may be added, but it is up to the builder's judgment and dependent upon the material being applied. In the case of adobe mud, once the initial layer is applied and allowed to harden it will crack and will need additional coats. With cement fewer layers are needed. The basic rule is: the more coats/layers, the stronger and better-looking the wall will be. This can be overdone however.

When a tin can wall has been sufficiently coated it will then be “finished” with a fine plaster (lime-based or other), stucco (if the wall is outside), or linseed oil (in the case of adobe). It can also be finished with a clay “slip”, or aliz, which is an earth-based coat that can have natural pigment and fine grains of mica mixed in to produce a beautiful shimmering and organic-looking surface.

== Examples ==
An outside tin can insulating wall is a simple design. It is made out of two tin can walls with a layer of solid insulation in the middle. The insulation can vary in thickness, depending on climate and budget. It can be made out of various “green” or sustainable materials or average run-of-the-mill solid insulation. The exposed sides of the tin can walls (those not facing the insulation) are finished using methods aforementioned. The inside part of the wall can be coated with adobe while the outside is finished with concrete and stucco.

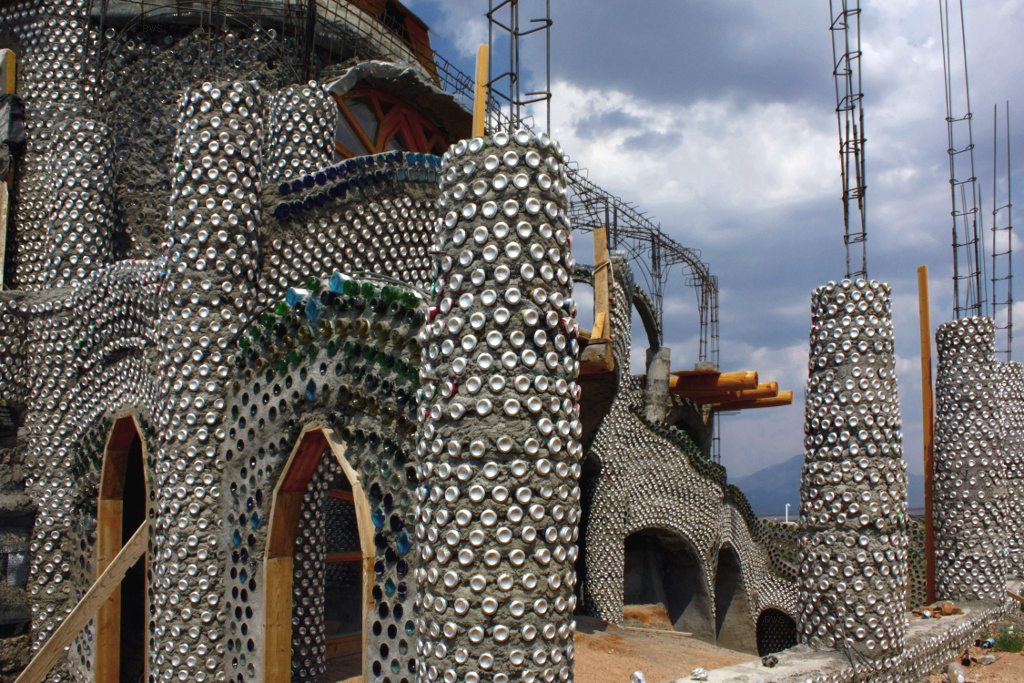
Tin can columns, walls and door frames with exposed metal lath in an Earthship home under construction in Taos County, New Mexico. Glass bottles around the first door frame, and much of the second, admit light.

A door frame can be built into the can wall, or rather the can wall is built around the frame. The process involves initially having a door frame set in place (on the foundation) and stacking cans to either side of the frame until they reach the other walls of the building and the ceiling. The door frame is fastened to the tin can wall by hammering nails partially into the side of the frame that will touch the tin can wall and allowing the concrete to harden around the nails. Short strips of metal lath are also attached to the frame and folded out (perpendicular to the frame) and allowed to set in the can/concrete matrix.

The same method is applied to windows. The only difference is all sides of window are fastened to the tin can wall, while the door frame is fastened to the foundation on one side (bottom) and the can wall on three sides. Metal lath and nails are all that is needed, along with a bubble level or similar device. Once the desired height is reached to install a window frame, the wall is leveled. If any cans stick above the level plane they can be flattened to the desired height. Nails and lath sticking out from under the window frame holds the bottom of it in place, and the sides and top of the frame are fastened in the same fashion as a door frame.

To make a smooth transition from door (or window frame) to tin can wall with plaster, sheets of metal lath are attached to the rim of the frame and folded over the gap between the frame and the can wall. A double-layered wooden frame is therefore required, to give a surface for the metal lath to be nailed to while leaving the inside frame untouched. However, this is not necessarily a necessity.

Electrical wiring is simple, with the wires attached to the cans or fastened to the concrete before the initial coat. If a wire needs to go to the other side of a wall it can be punched directly through a can. Plumbing and pipework can use similar methods. The can wall can always be built around a pipe, or there can be a wooden frame made similar to a window or door to house the pipe.

== Strength and use ==
Tin can walls are not considered load-bearing using this building method, although two-story circular dome structures have been built. The basic rule is that it can support considerable weight but should not be used to hold up much more than its own form and shape. It would not be wise to attach a heavy timber roof to a tin can wall without support beams or frames. The basic function for can walls is in-fill (filling in the space between support beams or the main structure) and the division of space. They work well to separate a living room from a bedroom, and are also used as insulating walls from the outside.

An earthship tin can wall is both an efficient and economical building method. They are mainly composed of aluminum and cement, and can withstand the test of time. They are made from few materials (the coating method can be more complex than building the wall itself). They use recycled materials and require little or no skill to build.

== Alternative methods ==
The other tin can wall method that will be briefly described is a system developed by a German artist named Michael Hönes. He has led community rebuilding efforts in Lesotho, Africa using tin cans to create housing and opportunities for Aids orphans and foster mothers. Known as the TCV (a.k.a. Tin-Can Villages) project, Hönes has created buildings using tin cans, masonite, paint, and wire. The roof is made out of corrugated metal shingles. In this method the cans are stacked vertically, one on top of the other in rows that are placed side by side and secured with wire. They are left exposed and are arranged in a decorative manner. The structures require no foundation, and are said to be able to withstand the Lesotho storms.

A site for the first village in Maseru has been secured and the funding has been sourced. What is lacking is building permits (as of July 2004). The TCV organization, headed by Hönes, has been prefabricating tin can walls so that when the permits pass about one building a week can be constructed.

So far the TCV organization's efforts have been concentrated on storehouses, offices, a large weaving workshop for the women of the Elelloang Basali Weavers group in Teyateyaneng, and a solar-powered restaurant that cooks with solar ovens. Michael Hönes also focuses on tin can furniture and has created a stove out of tin cans that uses one-third less wood than what the poor people of the area commonly use, thereby diminishing the firewood crisis in Lesotho.

== See also ==
- Bottle wall
- Earthship
