= British Independent Film Awards 2007 =

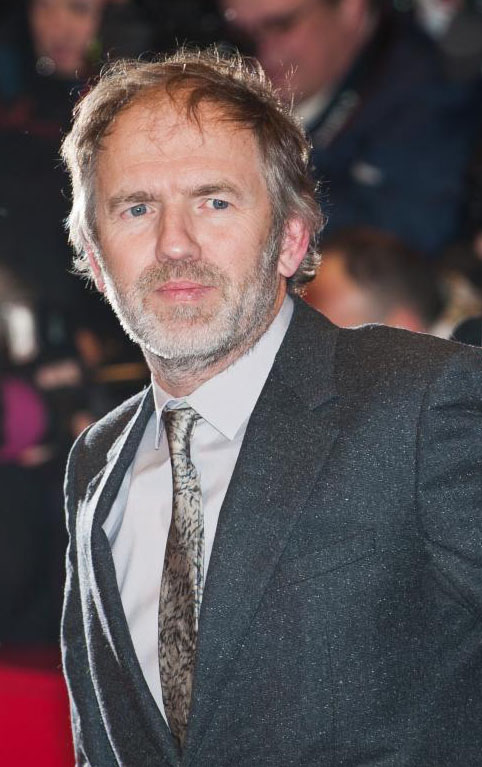
Anton Corbijn who won best director for his movie Control (2007).

The 10th British Independent Film Awards, held in November 2007 at the Roundhouse in Camden, London, honoured the best British independent films of 2007.

== Awards ==
=== Best British Independent Film ===
- Control
- And When Did You Last See Your Father?
- Eastern Promises
- Hallam Foe
- Notes on a Scandal

=== Best Director ===
- Anton Corbijn – Control
- Anand Tucker – And When Did You Last See Your Father?
- Sarah Gavron – Brick Lane
- David Cronenberg – Eastern Promises
- David Mackenzie – Hallam Foe

=== The Douglas Hickox Award ===
Given to a director of a British film on their debut feature

- Anton Corbijn – Control
- Marc Francis and Nick Francis – Black Gold
- Oliver Hodge – Garbage Warrior
- David Schwimmer – Run Fatboy Run
- Steve Hudson – True North

=== Best Actor ===
- Viggo Mortensen – Eastern Promises
- Jim Broadbent – And When Did You Last See Your Father?
- Sam Riley – Control
- Jamie Bell – Hallam Foe
- Cillian Murphy – Sunshine

=== Best Actress ===
- Judi Dench – Notes on a Scandal
- Anne Hathaway – Becoming Jane
- Tannishtha Chatterjee – Brick Lane
- Sophia Myles – Hallam Foe
- Kierston Wareing – It's a Free World...

=== Best Supporting Actor/Actress ===
- Toby Kebbell – Control
- Colin Firth – And When Did You Last See Your Father?
- Samantha Morton – Control
- Armin Mueller-Stahl – Eastern Promises
- Cate Blanchett – Notes on a Scandal

=== Best Screenplay ===
- Patrick Marber – Notes on a Scandal
- David Nicholls – And When Did You Last See Your Father?
- Matt Greenhalgh - Control
- Steven Knight – Eastern Promises
- Ed Whitmore and David Mackenzie – Hallam Foe

=== Most Promising Newcomer ===
- Sam Riley - Control
- Imogen Poots - 28 Weeks Later
- Matthew Beard - And When Did You Last See Your Father?
- Bradley Cole - Exhibit A
- Kierston Wareing – It's a Free World...

=== Best Achievement in Production ===
- Black Gold
- Control
- Exhibit A
- Extraordinary Rendition
- Garbage Warrior

=== Best Technical Achievement ===
- Mark Tildesley - Sunshine (for production design)
- Enrique Chediak - 28 Weeks Later (for cinematography)
- Trevor Waite - And When Did You Last See Your Father? (for editing)
- Martin Ruhe - Control (for cinematography)
- Colin Monie and David Mackenzie – Hallam Foe (for music)

=== Best British Documentary ===
- Joe Strummer: The Future Is Unwritten
- Black Gold
- Deep Water
- Garbage Warrior
- In the Shadow of the Moon

=== Best British Short ===
- Dog Altogether
- À bout de truffe
- Cherries
- The Girls
- What Does Your Daddy Do?

=== Best Foreign Film ===
- The Lives of Others - (Germany)
- La vie en rose - (France)
- Tell No One - (France)
- Once - (Ireland)
- Black Book - (Netherlands)

=== The Raindance Award ===
- The Inheritance
- Exhibit A
- Tovarisch, I Am Not Dead

=== The Richard Harris Award ===
- Ray Winstone

=== Special Jury Prize ===
- Robert Beeson, Andi Engel, Pamela Engel - Artificial Eye

=== Entertainment Personality Award ===
- Daniel Craig
