= Zoe Freney =

Australian artist

- Education: Adelaide Central School of Art, Adelaide Centre for the Arts, University of Adelaide
- Known for: painting
- Spouse: Dr Martin Freney
- Website: zoefreney.com

Zoe Freney is a South Australian artist, arts writer and arts educator. She and her husband, Martin Freney, have also built Australia’s first council-approved Earthship.

== Biography ==
Freney has a Diploma of Visual Art from Adelaide Central School of Art (2005), a Bachelor of Visual Art from Adelaide Centre for the Arts (2006), and a Master in Art History from the University of Adelaide (2010). Freney lectures in art history at Adelaide Central School of Art.

As an arts writer, she has written several catalogue essays and reviews (see Bibliography) and in 2017, she was one of four artists (including Daniel Connell) who travelled to India as part of a South Australian Government Arts Engagement Program.

She is married to Martin Freney and they have two sons. Together, they built a strawbale house and followed this by building Australia’s first council-approved Earthship, Earthship Ironbank, which they rent out as a B&B.

== Artistic style and subject ==
Freney is a painter whose paintings examine motherhood and often feature herself as model, as seen in the group exhibition, Good Mother, her solo exhibition, Motherology, and the group exhibition, Labors: An Exhibition Exploring the Complexities of Motherhood at Pearl Conard Gallery, Ohio State University (2018).

== Awards and prizes ==
She has been a finalist in the Heysen Landscape Art Prize (2018), the Prospect Portrait Prize (2017), the Fleurieu Biennale (2018) and the Emma Hack Art Prize (2017). Freney was also a joint winner of the inaugural Queen of Clubs Art Prize from Peter Lehmann Wines in 2000.

== Bibliography ==
- Review: Tom Phillips, Suburban Castaway, Art Guide Australia Online, January 2018
- These Four Walls, Catalogue Essay, Jess Mara, Floating Goose, Adelaide, February 2018
- Preview: Confluence, Art Guide Australia Online, September 2017
- Preview: Tarnanthi at JamFactory, Art Guide Australia, print edition, August–September 2017
- Feature: Deidre But-Husaim, bees, curiosity and coincidence, Art Guide Australia Online, July 2017
- Review, Emmaline Zanelli, Art Guide Australia Online, May 2017
- Preview: Both diggers and artists turn shrapnel into art, Art Guide Australia Online, November 2016
- Preview: Artists examine fallout of atomic age in Nuclear, Art Guide Australia Online, August 2016
- Preview: Nine collaborators unravel the elusive thread of art, Art Guide Australia Online, July 2016
- Non-Space generator, Catalogue Essay, Lily Ahlefeldt, CACSA Project Space, July 2016
- Vasari and the Perfect Wife: ‘fempathy’ as a strategic method in teaching art histories and theories,’ ACUADS Conference 2015: Art and Design Education in the Global 24/7, 24–25 September 2015, School of Art, Architecture and Design, University of South Australia
