= Garbage Warrior =

- Michael Reynolds standing on a Earthship construction area in Taos, New Mexico
- Directed by: Oliver Hodge
- Produced by: Rachel Wexler
- Starring: Mike Reynolds
- Release date: April 2007 (Hotdocs Film Festival)
- Country: United States
- Language: English
- Budget: $1.5 million

Garbage Warrior is a 2007 American documentary film about architect Mike Reynolds, inventor of the Earthship style of building, directed by Oliver Hodge.

== Plot ==
Oliver Hodge follows Reynolds in his development of the Earthship style of building and his struggle with the laws of Taos, New Mexico, the location of his experimental Earthship community, in order to be allowed to build homes that do not match the structures of local building codes.

The film concludes with a postscript showing Reynolds and his team of builders travelling to the Andaman Islands in the aftermath of the Boxing Day tsunami to assist the locals with disaster recovery and teaching them how to construct extremely low-cost earthships.

== Production ==
In an interview with Dazed, director Oliver Hodge described meeting Reynolds for the first time in Brighton and revealed that nearly a third of the documentary had been shot before he was able to secure funding.

== Reception ==
Following its release, the film was nominated for three awards at the British Independent Film Awards: Best British Documentary, Achievement in Production, and the Douglas Hickox Award. It also won the people's choice award for most popular international nonfiction film at the Vancouver International Film Festival.

Anthony Quinn, writing for The Independent, called the film "properly affectionate as well as being instructive" and called Reynolds "wholly cherishable." Mike McCahill, writing for The Telegraph, characterized the film as a "sometimes fuzzy-headed but good-spirited portrait of a single-minded visionary." Steve Rose gave the film three out of five stars in The Guardian, writing that he thought "the focus [was] a little narrow, but Reynolds is good company."

Eddie Cockrell, writing for Variety, and Cosmo Landesman, writing for The Sunday Times, both opined that green fans would enjoy the film although Landesman's review more temperately assessed Garbage Warrior as having "all the criticial insight of a corporate video." Philip French, writing for The Observer, called it a "fascinating story" but questioned whether relaxed architectural standards were the correct course of action in light of the then-recent 2008 Sichuan earthquake.
