= Michael E. Reynolds =

American architect

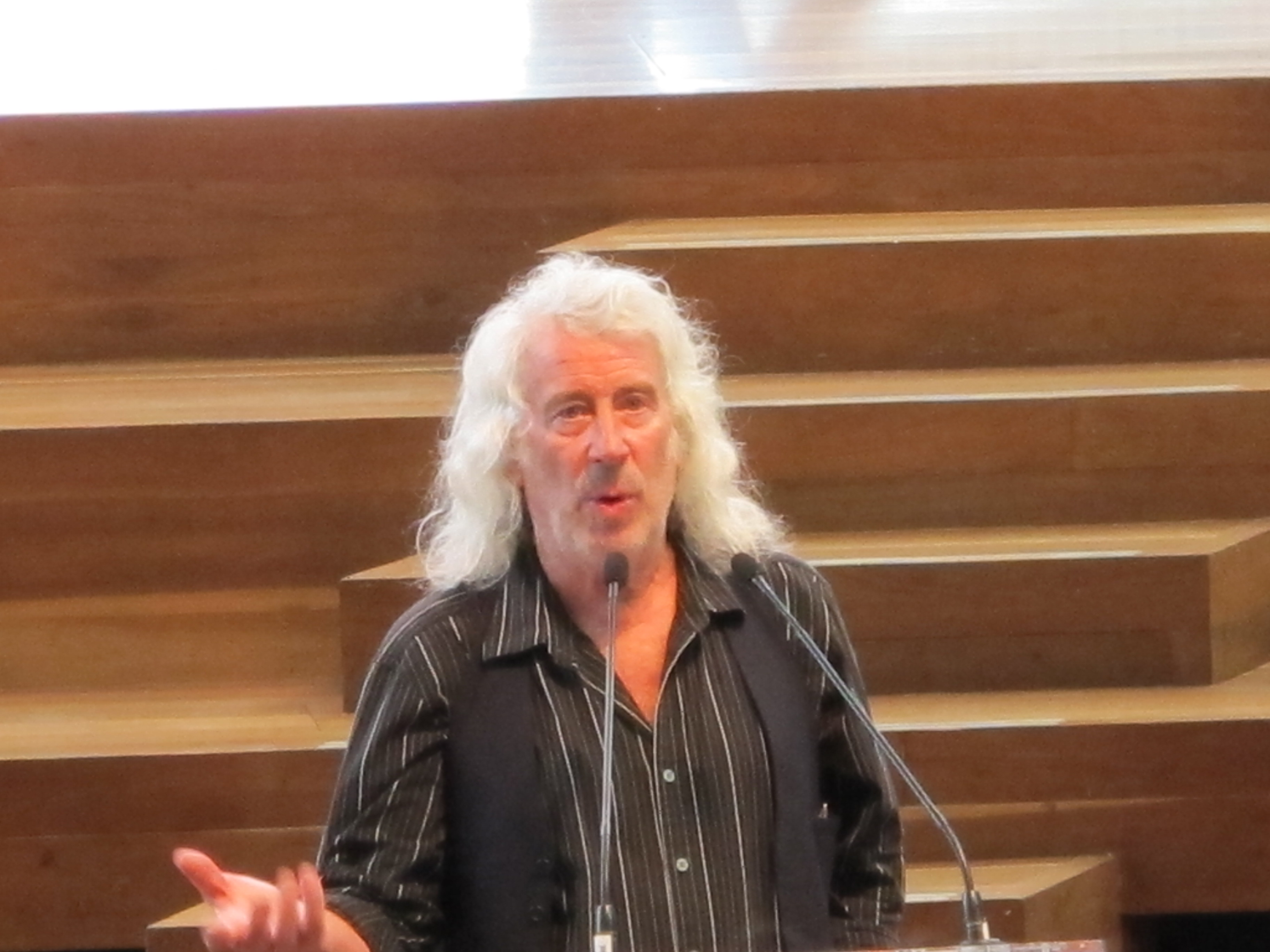
- Born: 1945 (age 80–81); Louisville, Kentucky, Estados Unidos.
- Education: University of Cincinnati
- Occupation: Architect

Michael E. Reynolds (born 1945) is an American architect based in New Mexico, known for the design and construction of "earthship" passive solar houses. He is a proponent of "radically sustainable living". He has been a critic of the profession of architecture for its adherence to conventional theory and practice, and he advocates the reuse of unconventional building materials from waste streams, such as automobile tires, and is known for designs that test the limits of building codes.

== Career ==
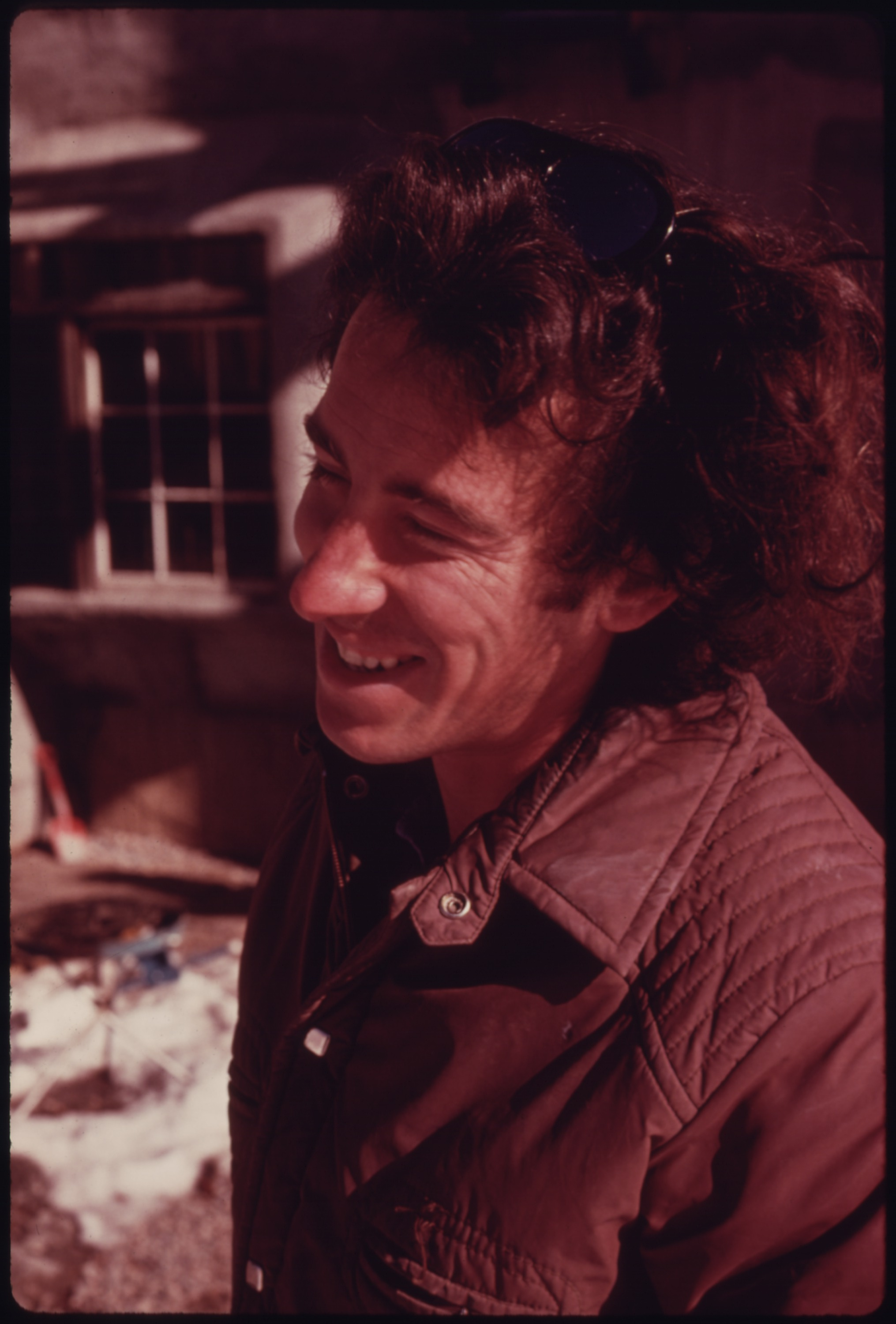
Michael Reynolds (1975)

Reynolds grew up in Louisville, Kentucky. He has said that his father's habit of hoarding and reusing materials was an early inspiration for utilizing recycled items. After graduating from the University of Cincinnati in 1969, Reynolds began producing his work. His thesis was published in Architectural Record in 1971 and the following year he built his first house from recycled materials. The structures built under his direction utilize everyday trash items like aluminum beverage cans, plastic bottles and used tires. Instead of using conventional, energy-consuming, recycling methods, Reynolds takes the discarded items and recycles them as-is. His Thumb House, built in 1972, used beer cans wired together into "bricks", which were mortared together and then plastered over. The brick design was patented in 1973.

Reynolds calls this practice "Earthship Biotecture". He cites as an epiphany the moment he realized that any object could be utilized—an old tire could become a powerful and durable thermal mass when it was filled with soil, or a pop bottle could be used for insulation. The packed soil stores and releases heat from the earth and sun. Each earthship home takes about 800 to 900 automobile tires. He has written five books on the subject.

Soon he was building and selling his experimental homes while continuing to use trial-and-error to improve them. Two of his early self-sufficient communities include the Rural Earthship Alternative Community Habitat (REACH) and the 1,100 acre Social Transformation Alternative Republic (STAR), both in northern New Mexico.

Over time, the earthships incorporated features designed to make them comfortable to inhabit while existing off-the-grid. Solar panels and geothermal cooling were added. The homes caught the attention of celebrities and environmental activists. Actors Dennis Weaver and Keith Carradine each commissioned Reynolds to build Earthships for them.

Though Reynolds always stressed the experimental nature of his homes, disillusioned buyers filed lawsuits and complaints over defects, such as leaky roofs and inadequate climate control. Spurred by the many claims against Reynolds, the State Architects Board of New Mexico stripped him of his credentials, saying his home designs were illegal and unsafe. In 1990, Reynolds gave up his New Mexico architecture and construction licenses after a year-long dispute with several clients.

With the rise in concern over global warming, Reynolds has been elevated as a prophet of the green movement. A 2007 documentary, Garbage Warrior, glorifies his life and work. In the film, Reynolds is quoted as saying he fell into depression after his licensing troubles. Faced with the end of his career, Reynolds agreed to follow state and federal codes, though not without protest. Relationships with his former clients whose earthships failed were never repaired, though the state's intervention left some satisfied that at least others would not be affected in the same ways they had. Reynolds' architect's license was reinstated in 2007 after a 17-year battle, and he resumed building earthships. Since then, the American Institute of Architects has asked Reynolds to give a lecture at its headquarters in Colorado.

In Garbage Warrior, Reynolds describes one of his new homes, called the Phoenix: "There's nothing coming into this house, no power lines, no gas lines, no sewage lines coming out, no water lines coming in, no energy being used ... We're sitting on 6,000 gallons of water, growing food, sewage internalized, 70 degrees [21 °C] year-round ... What these kind of houses are doing is taking every aspect of your life and putting it into your own hands ... A family of four could totally survive here without having to go to the store."

Reynolds features in episode 5 of the 2008 documentary Stephen Fry in America. Reynolds gives Fry a guided tour of his house, describing the various features and their functions.

Reynolds explains how his buildings can operate off the electrical grid, requiring little or no mortgage payment and no utility bills.

== Bibliography ==
- Reynolds, Michael (1989). A Coming of Wizards. High Mesa Press. ISBN 978-0-9614010-3-0.
- Reynolds, Michael (1990). Earthship: How to Build Your Own. Vol. 1. Solar Survival Press. ISBN 978-0-9626767-0-3.
- Reynolds, Michael (1991). Earthship: System and Components. Vol. 2. Solar Survival. ISBN 978-0-9626767-1-0.
- Reynolds, Michael (1993). Earthship: Evolution Beyond Economics. Vol. 3. Solar Survival. ISBN 978-0-9626767-2-7.
- Reynolds, Michael (2000). Comfort in Any Climate. Solar Survival. ISBN 978-0-9626767-4-1.
- Reynolds, Michael (2005). Water from the Sky. Solar Survival. ISBN 978-0-9626767-5-8.
- Reynolds, Michael (2008). Journey. Taos, N.M: Earthship Biotecture. ISBN 978-1-60585-037-5.

== Gallery ==
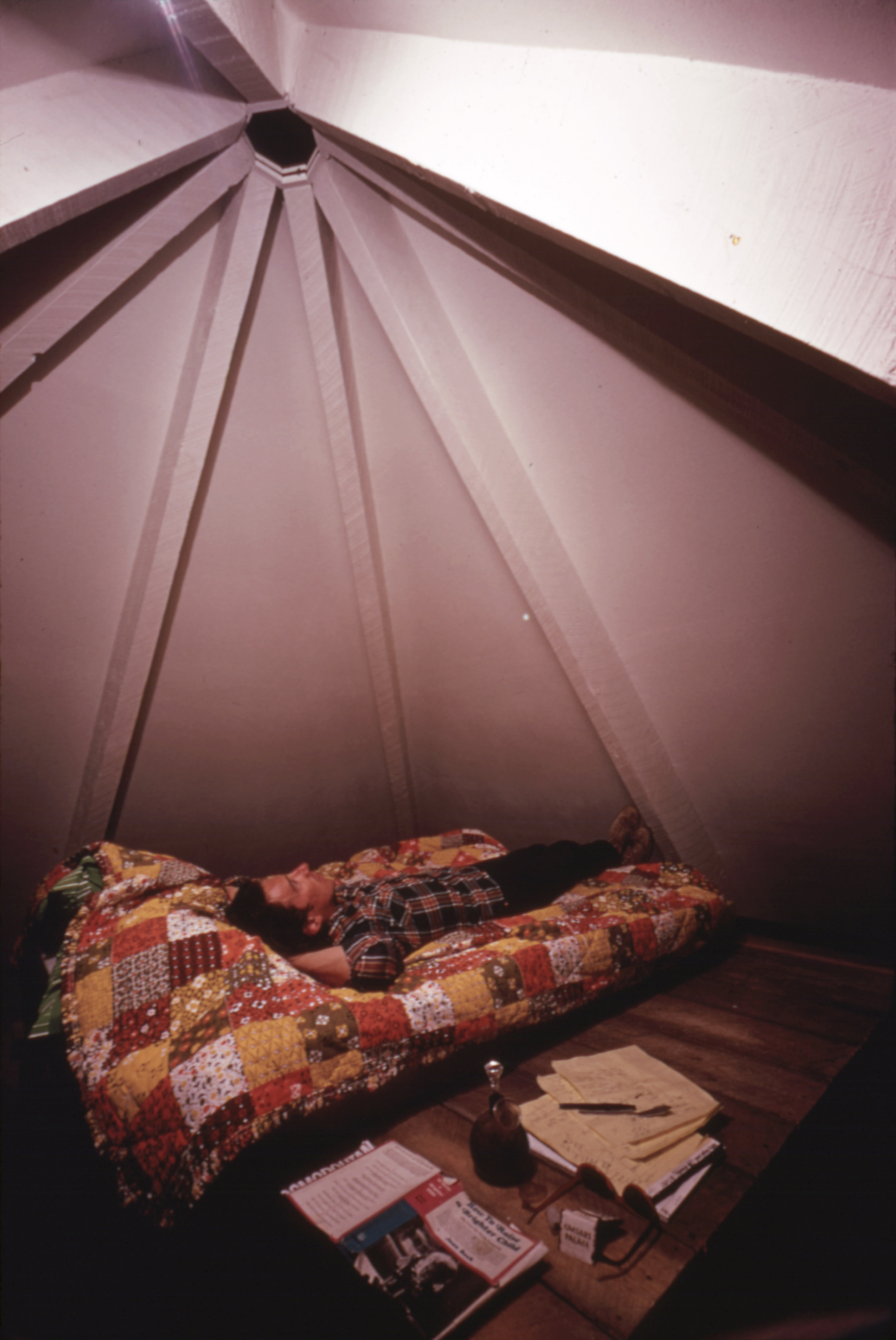
Reynolds in the 1970s with his journal

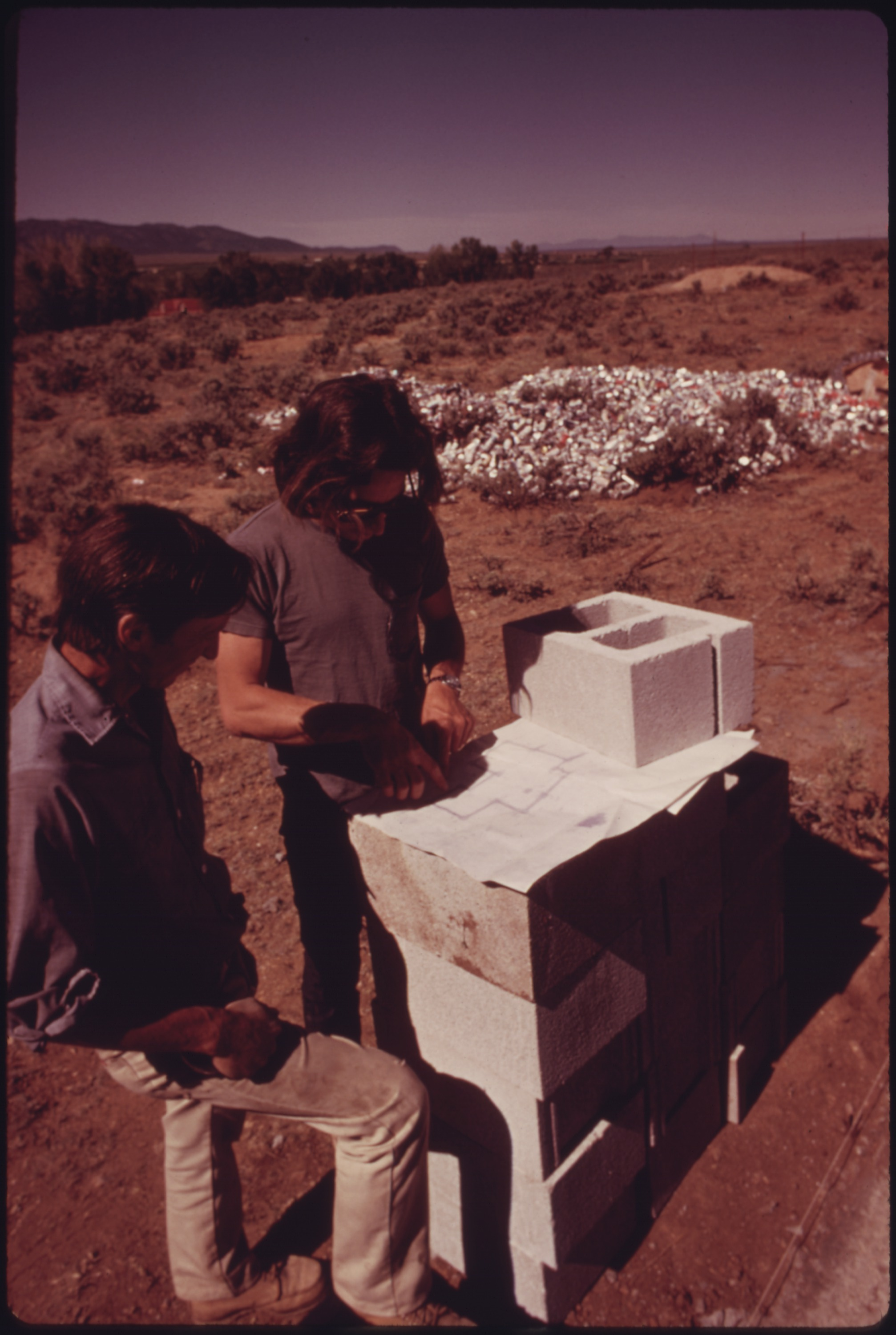
Reynolds examining plans in the 1970s

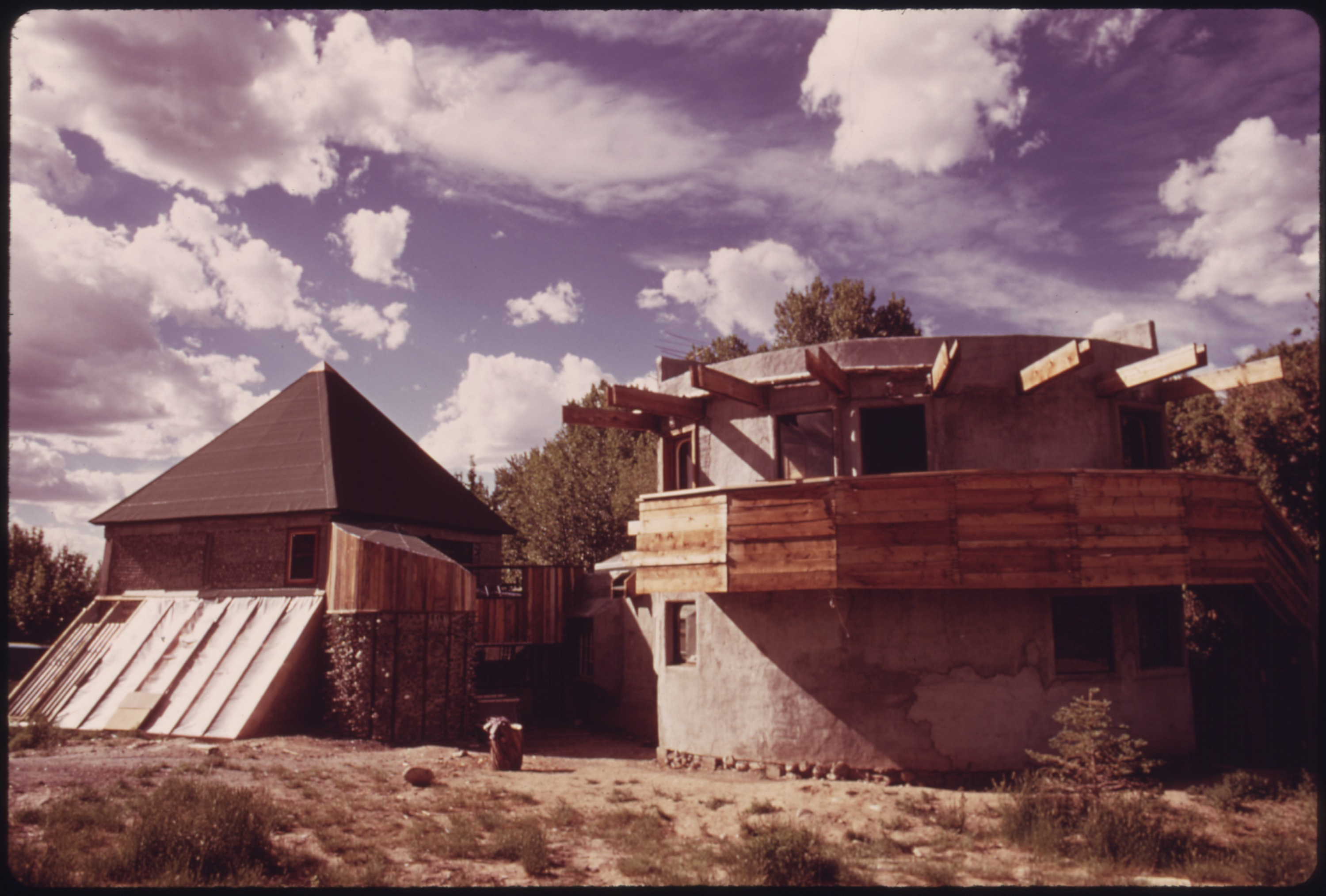
Mike Reynolds house, 1974

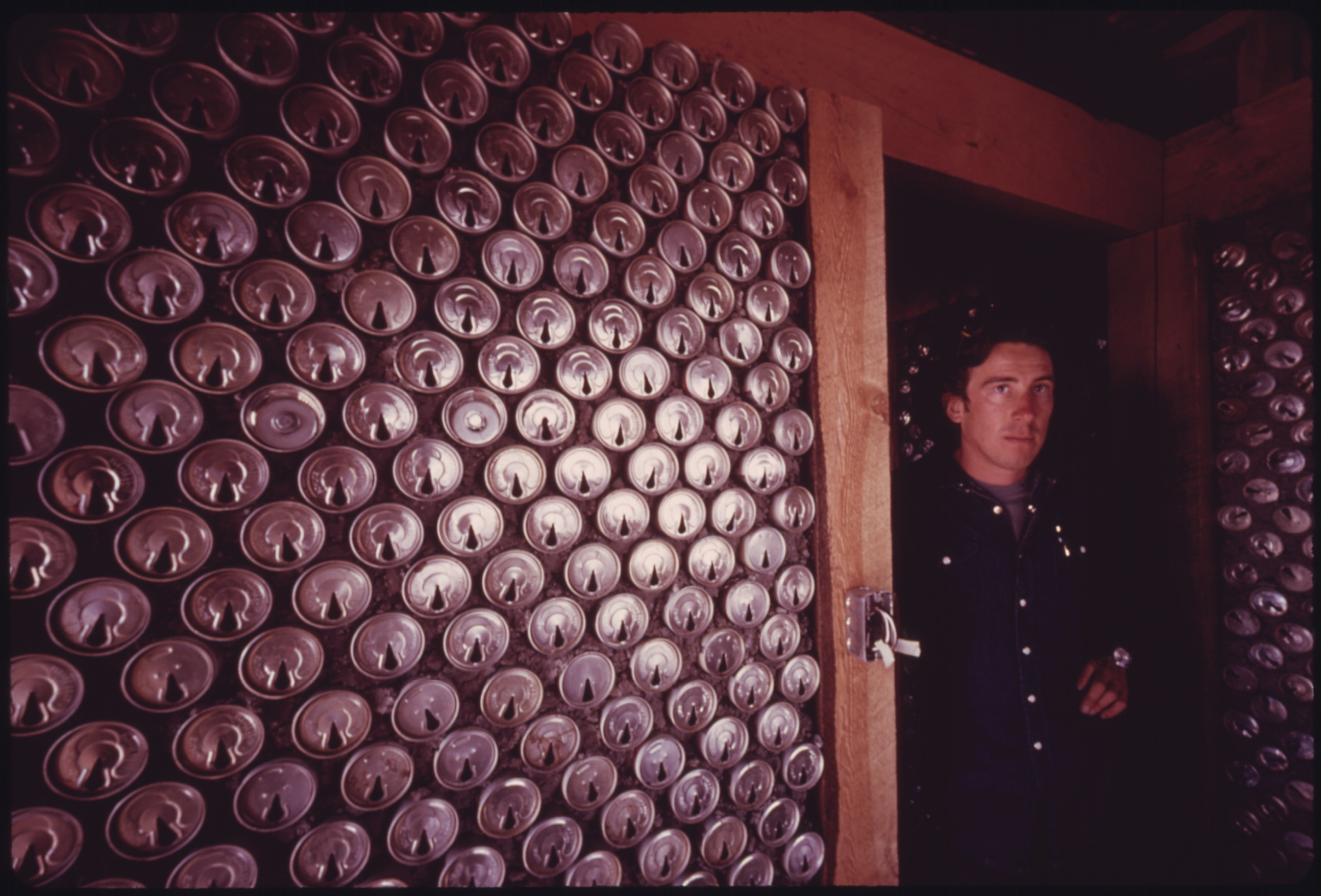
Reynolds and beer can wall
