= Fire alarm (disambiguation) =

A fire alarm is an alarm that warns people about a fire.

Fire alarm may also refer to:

- Fire alarm control panel, a controlling component
- Manual fire alarm activation, a pull station
- Fire alarm call box, a device used for notifying a fire department
- Fire alarm notification appliance, an active fire protection component
- The Fire Alarm, a Looney Tunes animated cartoon

== See also ==
- Multiple-alarm fire, a classification of the seriousness of a fire
