= Fire Industry Association =

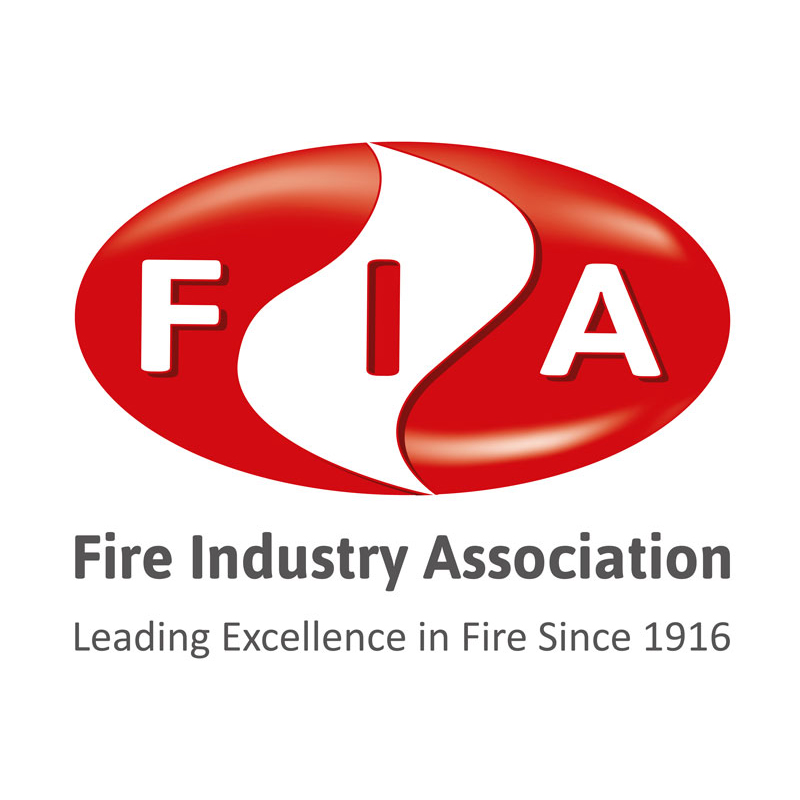
FIA logo.

The Fire Industry Association (FIA) is a not-for-profit organisation formed originally by the merger of the Fire Extinguishing Trades Association (FETA) and the British Fire Protection Systems Association (BFPSA).

It is said to be "the largest fire protection trade association in the UK".

The FIA's objective "is to promote, improve and perfect fire protection methods, devices, services and apparatus" which they say they achieve "through the representation of [their] members, providing technical support, guidance and opportunities for professional advancement through education and appropriate regulation".

== Membership ==
As of September 2024, the FIA has over 1,200 members

== Organisational Structure - Board ==
The FIA is "overseen by a Board and seven Councils".

The members of the Board are "representatives from FIA member companies and are elected to the seats on the Board for a term of two years".

As of September 2024, the board consists of representatives from:·Chair - Martin Watson, Mitie Security / Vice Chair - Tony Hanley, Firepro UK Ltd / CEO - Ian Moore, Fire Industry Association Ltd / Member - Stacey Adams, Apollo Fire Detectors Ltd / Member - Michelle Agius, Eurotech Fire Systems Ltd / Member - Robert Campbell, No Climb Products Ltd / Member - Alan Elder, Tyco Fire Protection Products / Member - Bernie Higgins, PGS International (UK) Ltd / Member - James Jones, Vimpex Ltd / Member - Peter Massingberd-Mundy, Xtralis / Member - Donald MCFARLANE, Honeywell Fire Safety / Member - Guy Middleton, Chubb Fire & Security Ltd / Member - Jon Pagan, International Fire Consultants Ltd / Member - Paul Pope, AJAX Systems UK Limited / Member - Andy Spence, Britannia Fire Ltd / Member - Colin Todd, C S Todd and Associates

== Organisational Structure - Councils ==
As of September 2024, the FIA has seven councils, described as follows:

- Export Council - Promoting export opportunities around the globe
- Extinguishing Council - For manufacturers and suppliers of fire extinguishing equipment
- Fire Detection and Alarm Council - The home for fire detection and alarm equipment manufacturers and suppliers
- Fire Engineering Council - Representing fire engineering service providers across the UK
- Fire Risk Assessment Council - Representing fire risk assessment services
- FIRESA Council - Manufacturers/suppliers of goods & service to the fire & rescue services
- Services Council - Installers, designers, commissioners & maintainers of fire protection systems

== Promoting professional standards ==
The FIA refers to its role in "promot[ing] and shap[ing] legislation and the professional standards of the fire industry through close liaison with government and official bodies, as well as other key stakeholders". This is evidenced, for example, with their involvement on many of the BSI committees responsible for the authoring of key British Standards relating to fire, including:

- BSI Committee FSH/0 Strategic Policy Group for Fire Standardization;
- BSI Committee FSH/2 Fire extinguishers, whose responsibilities include the standards:
  - BS 5306 (including BS 5306-3, BS 5306-8 and BS 5306-9); and
  - BS EN 3; and
- BSI Committee FSH/12 Fire detection and alarm systems, whose responsibilities include the standards:
  - BS 5839 (including BS 5839-1 and BS 5839-6)

== History ==
The Fire Extinguishing Trades Association (FETA) was "the Trade Association of manufacturers and maintainers of portable fire fighting equipment". It was "Established in 1916 [and was] a non-profit making organisation funded by membership subscription" whose objective was to "uphold and enhance the professional status of the Fire Protection Industry by encouraging the adoption of improved standards for product, service and quality management systems and promoting greater use of high quality products and services to the benefit of all".

It merged with the BFPSA in April 2007 to form the FIA.
