= BS 5839 Part 1 =

British standard for fire alarm systems

BS 5839 Part 1 Fire detection and fire alarm systems for buildings – Part 1: Code of practice for design, installation, commissioning and maintenance of systems in non-domestic premises is a standard published by the British Standards Institution. BS 5839-1:2017 supersedes BS 5839-1:2013, which has been withdrawn. It s the first of 9 parts in a series on national standards relating to fire alarms.

== Purpose ==
BS 5839 Part 1 provides recommendations for the planning, design, installation, commissioning and maintenance of fire detection and fire alarm systems for non-domestic premises. Recommendations for fire detection and fire alarm systems in domestic premises are given in BS 5839-6. It does not recommend whether or not a fire detection and alarm system should be installed in any given premises, nor does it provide any exceptions for non-domestic premises which are under construction.

The term "fire detection and fire alarm systems" is a fairly wide definition, including small systems whose field devices consist only of sounders and manual call points, to complex networked systems with a large number of automatic fire detectors, manual call points and sounders, connected to numerous networked control and indicating panels.

BS 5839 Part 1 does not cover systems whose primary function is to control or extinguish fire (such as sprinklers or automatic extinguishing systems), but does cover the secondary alarm signal generated by such systems. It also does not cover voice alarm systems (which are separately addressed in BS 5839-8), or systems that integrate fire alarm functions with non fire related functions. It also does not cover manually or mechanically operated notification devices, such as hand-cranked bells.

The NHS Estates publications HTM 05-03 Part B (in England and Wales) or SHTM 82(in Scotland) provide recommendations for fire detection and fire alarm systems in hospitals.

System components should comply with the appropriate EN 54 family part, developed by British Standards Institution as BS EN 54-.

== Structure ==
Section 1: General

- Scope
- Normative references
- Terms and definitions
- Need for a fire detection and fire alarm system and type of system
- Categories of system
- Exchange of information and definition of responsibilities
- Variations from the recommendations of this standard

Section 2: Design considerations

- Relationship between system Category and areas protected
- Actuation of other fire protection systems or safety facilities
- Systems in explosive gas or dust atmospheres
- System components
- Monitoring, integrity and reliability of circuits external to control equipment
- Detection zones
- Alarm zones
- Communication with the fire and rescue service
- Audible alarm signals
- Visual alarm signals
- Fire alarm warnings for people with impaired hearing
- Staged fire alarms
- Manual call points
- Types of fire detector and their selection
- Spacing and siting of automatic fire detectors
- Control and indicating equipment
- Networked systems
- Power supplies
- Cables, wiring and other interconnections
- Radio-linked systems
- Electromagnetic compatibility
- Electrical safety

Section 3: Limitation of false alarms

- Responsibility for limitation of false alarms
- Categories of false alarms
- Acceptable rate of false alarms
- Causes of false alarms
- Design process for limitation of false alarms
- Measures to limit false alarms

Section 4: Installation

- Responsibility of installers
- Installation practices and workmanship
- Inspection and testing of wiring

Section 5: Commissioning and handover

- Commissioning
- Documentation
- Certification
- Acceptance
- Verification

Section 6: Maintenance

- Routine testing
- Inspection and servicing
- Non-routine attention

Section 7: User’s responsibilities

- Premises management
- Logbook

== System Categories ==
Fire detection and alarm systems are installed in premises in order to protect either life, property or both. Other objectives, such as the protection against business interruption or protection of the environment are likely to be met by the recommendations of BS 5839 Part 1.

BS 5839 Part 1 categorises fire alarm systems as:

- "M" - manual system (no automatic fire detectors so the building is fitted with call points and sounders),
- "L" - automatic systems intended for the protection of life, and
- "P" - automatic systems intended for the protection of property.

Categories for automatic systems are further subdivided into L1 to L5, and P1 to P2:

- "L5" - systems designed to satisfy a specific fire safety objective (other than that of a Category L1, L2, L3 or L4 system).
- "L4" - installed within escape routes comprising, such as corridors and stairways.
- "L3" - as "L4", plus automatic detection to rooms which open onto an escape route.
- "L2" - as "L3, plus automatic detection installed in defined parts of the building.
- "L1" - systems installed throughout all areas of the building.
- "P2" - systems installed only in defined parts of the premises.
- "P1" - systems installed throughout the premises.

No recommendations are made in BS 5839 Part 1 as to which (if any) category to specify for any given premises (although it does include examples of typical categories of typical buildings in Annex A). System category recommendations can be found in BS 9999.

== Part 9 ==
BS 5839-9:2011, Fire detection and fire alarm systems for buildings. Code of practice for the design, installation, commissioning and maintenance of emergency voice communication systems, part 9 in the series of national standards, covers the design, installation and maintenance of emergency voice communication systems where they form part of a fire safety strategy. The 2011 version replaced an earlier 2003 version and reflects more recent regulatory and legislative requirements for building evacuation, including for people with a disability.
