= Fire alarm notification appliance =

Device used to alert a fire emergency

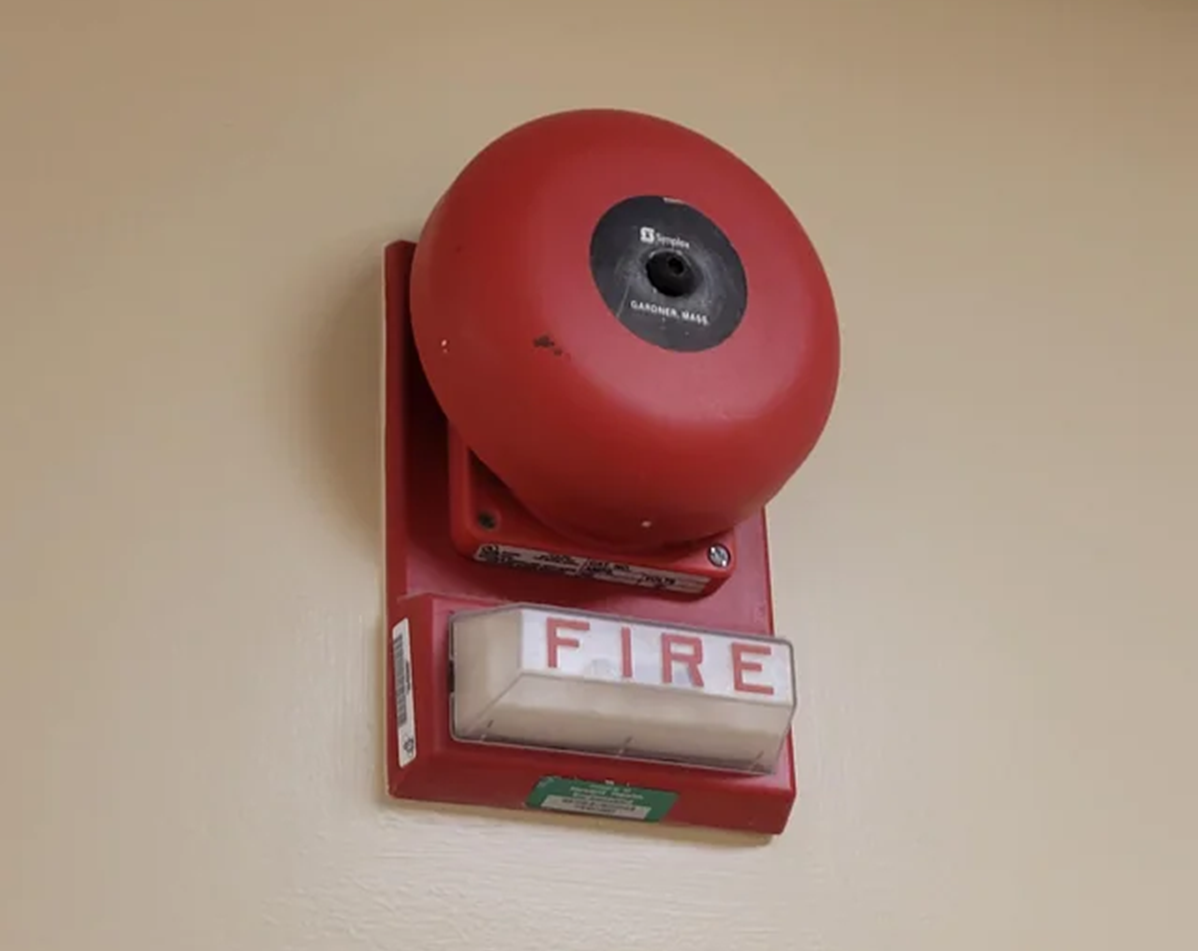
A Simplex SM24-6 fire alarm bell

A fire alarm notification appliance, often simply called a fire alarm, is an active fire protection component of a fire alarm system. A notification appliance may use audible, visible, or other stimuli to alert the occupants of a fire or other emergency condition requiring action. Audible appliances have been in use longer than any other method of notification. Initially, all appliances were either electromechanical horns or electric bells, which would later be replaced by electronic sounders. Most of today's appliances produce sound levels between 80 and 100 decibels at 3 ft (1 m).

== Methods of notification ==
The primary function of the notification appliance is to alert persons at risk. Several methods are used and documented in industry specifications published by UL.

Alerting methods include:

- Sound (audible signals)
  - 95 dBs at 3,100 Hz tone are used in many current notification devices.
  - 80 dBs at 520 Hz tone are used in newer notification devices.
  - 80 to 100 dBs weighted for human hearing (higher decibels, in the 100 to 115 dBs range, were common with older electromechanical horns)
- Light (visible signals)
  - 15 cd to 1,000 cd output
  - 1 to 2 flashes per second

== Coding ==
The standard fire alarm sound used in most of North America.

Coding refers to the pattern or tones a notification appliance sounds in and is controlled either by the panel or by setting jumpers or DIP switches on the notification appliances. The majority of audible notification appliances installed prior to 1996 produced a steady sound for evacuation. In general, no common standard at that time mandated any particular tone, or pattern for audible fire alarm evacuation signals. While less common than a steady sound, differing signaling methods were used for the same purpose. These are named with respect to their distinctive structure and include, March Time (usually 120 pulses per minute but sometimes at 90 pulses or 20 pulses per minute, depending on the panel), Hi-Lo (two different tones that alternate), Slow-Whoop (slow rising sweep upwards in tone) among others. Today these methods are confined to applications intended to trigger a response other than evacuation alone. In 1996, the ANSI and the NFPA recommended a standard evacuation pattern to eliminate confusion. The pattern is uniform without regard to the sound used. This pattern, which is also used for smoke alarms, is named the Temporal-Three alarm signal, often referred to as "T-3" or "Code-3" (ISO 8201 and ANSI/ASA S3.41 Temporal Pattern) and produces an interrupted four count (three half second pulses, followed by a one and one half second pause, repeated for a minimum of 180 seconds). CO (carbon monoxide) detectors are specified to use a similar pattern using four pulses of tone (often referred to as T4).

== Audibility ==
From NFPA 72, 2002 Edition: “7.4.2.1* To ensure that audible public mode signals are clearly heard, unless otherwise permitted by 7.4.2.2 through 7.4.2.5, they shall have a sound level at least 15 dBs above the average ambient sound level or 5 dBs above the maximum sound level having a duration of at least 60 seconds, whichever is greater, measured 1.5 m (5 ft) above the floor in the occupiable area, using the A-weighted scale (dBA).”

== Visual signals ==
A Maple Armor FW982R LED strobe light mounted on a ceiling.

In 1970, Space Age Electronics introduced the first visual notification appliance, the AV32 light plate (which was installed over an existing horn) and V33 remote light. Meanwhile, in 1976, Wheelock introduced the first horn/strobe notification appliances with its 7000 series. The majority of visual signals throughout the 1970s and 1980s were white or red incandescent lights. In the 1980s, most new installations began to include visual signals, and more strobes started to appear. In the United States, the 1990 Americans with Disabilities Act (ADA) triggered changes in evacuation signaling methods to include the hearing impaired. Audible notification appliances would now have to include strobe lights with higher brightness intensity to alert the hearing impaired. This made incandescent lights inadequate for the purposes of the ADA.

Many existing installations that did not include visual signals were retrofitted with strobe plates. These retrofit plates would allow for the easy installation of a strobe without replacing the audible signal. Later, ADA codes also required that strobes be at least 15 candelas and have a flash rate of at least 60 flashes per minute (one flash per second). Companies discontinued their translucent strobes, and replaced them with new, clear, high-intensity strobes. Today, strobe synchronization is often used to synchronize all strobes in a uniform flash pattern. This is to prevent individuals with photosensitive epilepsy from potentially experiencing seizures due to unsynchronized strobes.

== Voice evacuation ==
Voice evacuation systems (also called Voice Alarm Systems) have become popular in most countries. Voice evacuation alarms typically are not as loud as horns or bells (although generally standards require the same minimum sound pressure levels), and usually sound an alarm tone (typically a slow whoop, code-3, chime tone or simulated bell tone, although this depends on the country and particular application) and a voice message warning that an emergency has been reported and to evacuate the building (often also directing occupants to not use elevators). Voice evacuation systems can also be used by personnel to give specific live information and/or instructions over the alarm system using a built-in microphone, which provides a distinct advantage over horns or bells. The system can be stand alone (i.e. using dedicated loudspeakers, which can also feature integrated strobe lights), or the system can accommodate public address system functionality. In 1973, the Autocall fire alarm company (merged to SimplexGrinnell then relaunched), manufactured the first voice evacuation system.

=== Voice evacuation in Europe ===
In Europe, voice evacuation systems are normally a mandatory requirement for rail and air transport terminals, high-rise buildings, schools, hospitals, and other large facilities. Voice systems for emergency use date back at least as far as the second world war. Following the lead of companies like Avalon, Tannoy and Millbank Electronics etc., in the 1980s many other companies began producing voice-evacuation systems. In the 1990s, voice evacuation started to become the standard for large facilities, and is still growing in popularity. The use, design, operation and installation of Voice evacuation systems is governed in Europe by CENELEC European Committee for Electrotechnical Standardization EN 60849 and in the UK by the British Standard BS 5839-Part 8, a system code of practice. This is joined by the European harmonised equipment standards family EN 54, and ISO 7240-16:2007.

== Effectiveness ==
Initial research into the effectiveness of the various alerting methods is sparse. From 2005 to 2007, research sponsored by the NFPA focused on understanding the cause of a higher number of deaths seen in high-risk groups such as the elderly, those with hearing loss, and those who are intoxicated. Research findings suggest that a mid frequency (520 Hz) square wave output is significantly more effective at waking high-risk individuals. More recent research suggests that strobe lights are not effective at waking sleeping adults with hearing loss and suggest that a different alarm tone is much more effective. Individuals in the hearing loss community are seeking changes to improved awakening methods.

=== Effectiveness of mid frequency (520 Hz) sound ===
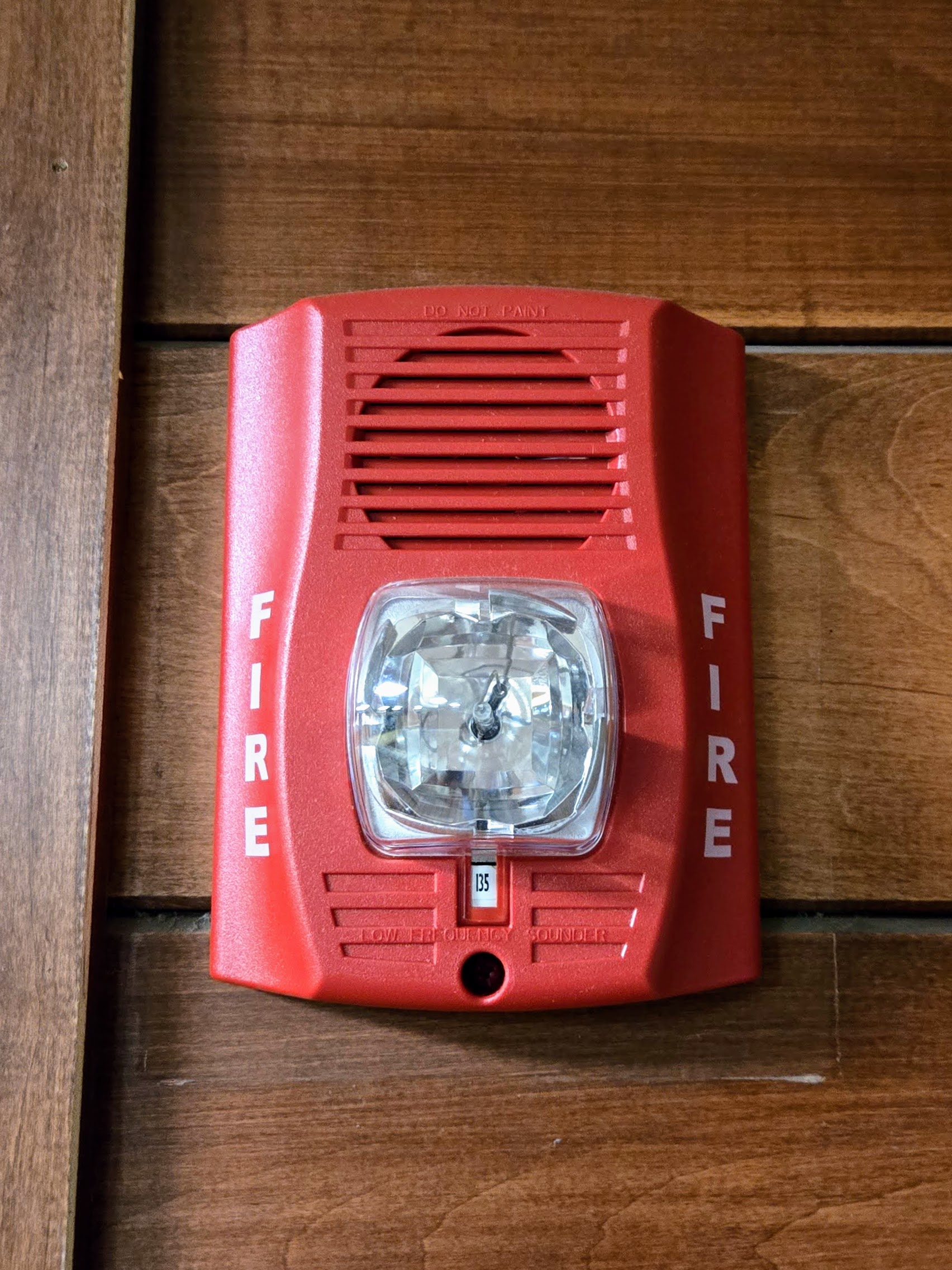
520 Hz sounder/visual alerting device manufactured by System Sensor.

Further NFPA research demonstrated the heightened waking effectiveness of mid frequency square wave auditory signals that use 520 Hz, especially when used to wake people with mild to moderately severe hearing loss. Two separate studies were conducted – one for the hard-of-hearing and one for the alcohol-impaired – in order to compare the waking effectiveness of 520 Hz mid frequency square wave devices and 3,100 Hz pure tone T-3 sound devices.

Under the testing conditions, a 520 Hz square wave T-3 sound woke up 92% of hard-of-hearing participants, making it the most effective. The 3100 Hz pure tone T-3 sound woke up 56% of participants.

A summary of the studies shows that the 520 Hz square wave signal has at least 4 to 12 times more waking effectiveness than the current 3,100 Hz signal.

=== NFPA code implementation of mid frequency (520 Hz) sound ===
Effective January 1, 2014, section 18.4.5.3 of the 2010 and later editions of NFPA 72 requires the mid frequency audible fire alarm signal in occupancy sleeping areas with a protected premises (building) fire alarm system. The Chapter 18 committee chose to apply the requirement to all sleeping areas – not just those where occupants have self-identified as having a hearing impairment. This was done intentionally for several reasons: in many cases, the applications impacted are lodging spaces such as hotels, and many people may not know they have a hearing impairment or they may be alcohol impaired.

The 520 Hz mid frequency signal is required in sleeping areas of the following buildings:

- Hotels and motels
- College and university dormitories
- Retirement/assisted-living facilities without trained staff responsible for waking up patients
- Dwelling units within apartments and condominiums

According to NFPA 72-2010, section 18.4.5.3*, audible appliances provided for sleeping areas to awaken occupants shall produce a mid frequency alarm signal that complies with the following (effective January 1, 2014):

- (1) The alarm signal shall be a square wave or provide equivalent awakening ability.
- (2) The wave shall have a fundamental frequency of 520 Hz at +/- 10 percent.

== See also ==
- Fire protection
- Active fire protection
- Passive fire protection
- Fire alarm control panel
- Fire alarm pull station
- Fire drill
- False alarm
- Fire alarm system
- Smoke detector
