= Wheelock (brand) =

Fire alarm product by Eaton Corporation

- Product type: Fire alarms, signaling devices
- Introduced: 1922

Wheelock is a fire alarm and general signaling products manufacturer owned by Eaton Corporation.

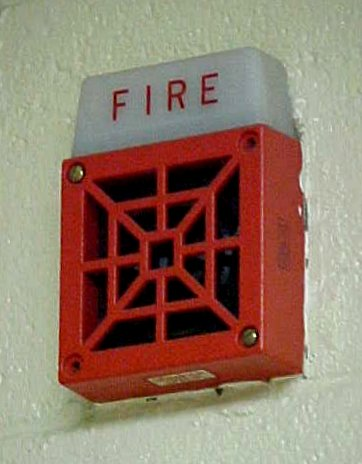
An early Wheelock 7002 (or 7002T) horn/strobe

== History ==
Older Wheelock Logo (1984-2006)

The company was founded in 1922 by John Wheelock as Signal Engineering. During the early years, they made bells, horns, and relays for telephone extension alert purposes.. Some of the earliest signals produced by Signal Engineering were the A-1 series of AC-powered, dual-projector electromechanical horns.

Signal Engineering became Wheelock Signals during the 1950s, and then just simply Wheelock in 1984.

In the early 1970s, Wheelock entered the fire alarm industry. They introduced the 31 (AC-powered) and 34 (DC-powered) series of electromechanical horns. Around 1978, Wheelock created the 7001 (2-wire, flush-mount DC), 7002 (2-wire, surface-mount DC), 34+WS (4-wire, surface-mount DC), and 7004 (2-wire, surface-mount AC) electromechanical horn/strobes, as well as the WS series of remote strobes. These were the first fire alarm signals to use xenon strobes instead of incandescent lights. The signals either had pigtail leads or screw terminals for power. Models with screw terminals had the letter "T" in their model numbers (e.g. 34T, 7002T). The horn and strobe on the 7001 and 7002 models are wired in series, causing the horn to produce a distinctive "skipping" sound when the strobe flashes, similar to the "March Time" code. In late 1984, Wheelock redesigned the horn's grilles, making them vandal resistant; and shortly thereafter, pigtail leads were discontinued. This product line became extremely popular among third-party security companies, such as Honeywell, Ademco, and Cerberus Pyrotronics (now part of Siemens AG). In 1994, Wheelock discontinued this series, because their low-intensity strobes did not meet the new light distribution requirements of the ADA. The replacement was the MT series. The 31T is still in production today for general signaling purposes.

In March, 2006, Wheelock, Inc was acquired by Cooper Industries.

Cooper Wheelock also produces several bells as well as speakers, synchronization modules, booster power supplies, chimes and voice evacuation products. Cooper Wheelock does not manufacture fire alarm control panels (except for the Safepath Voice Evacuation System), smoke detectors, or heat detectors. However, many fire alarm control panels are compatible with Cooper Wheelock's line of notification appliances and other products. Wheelock also produces notification devices for Siemens Building Technologies for its fire alarm systems such as the Cerberus Pro Modular. These notification devices manufactured for Siemens are the same device, but with major differences in synchronization. A few examples of some products Wheelock makes for Siemens include the Z-Series (ZH and ZR series), E series (SE, SEF, SEFH, SEH and SET series), the LED3 and Eluxa series (SL and SL2 series), and more, with the exception of Exceder Xenon devices.

== Products ==
A 34T mechanical horn (Honeywell)

=== Series ET ===
The ET Series was a series of speakers / speaker strobes released around 1983, and utilized the 7000 series style strobes, model (ET1010-WS) had a strobe and (ET1010) was a speaker only

=== Series MT ===
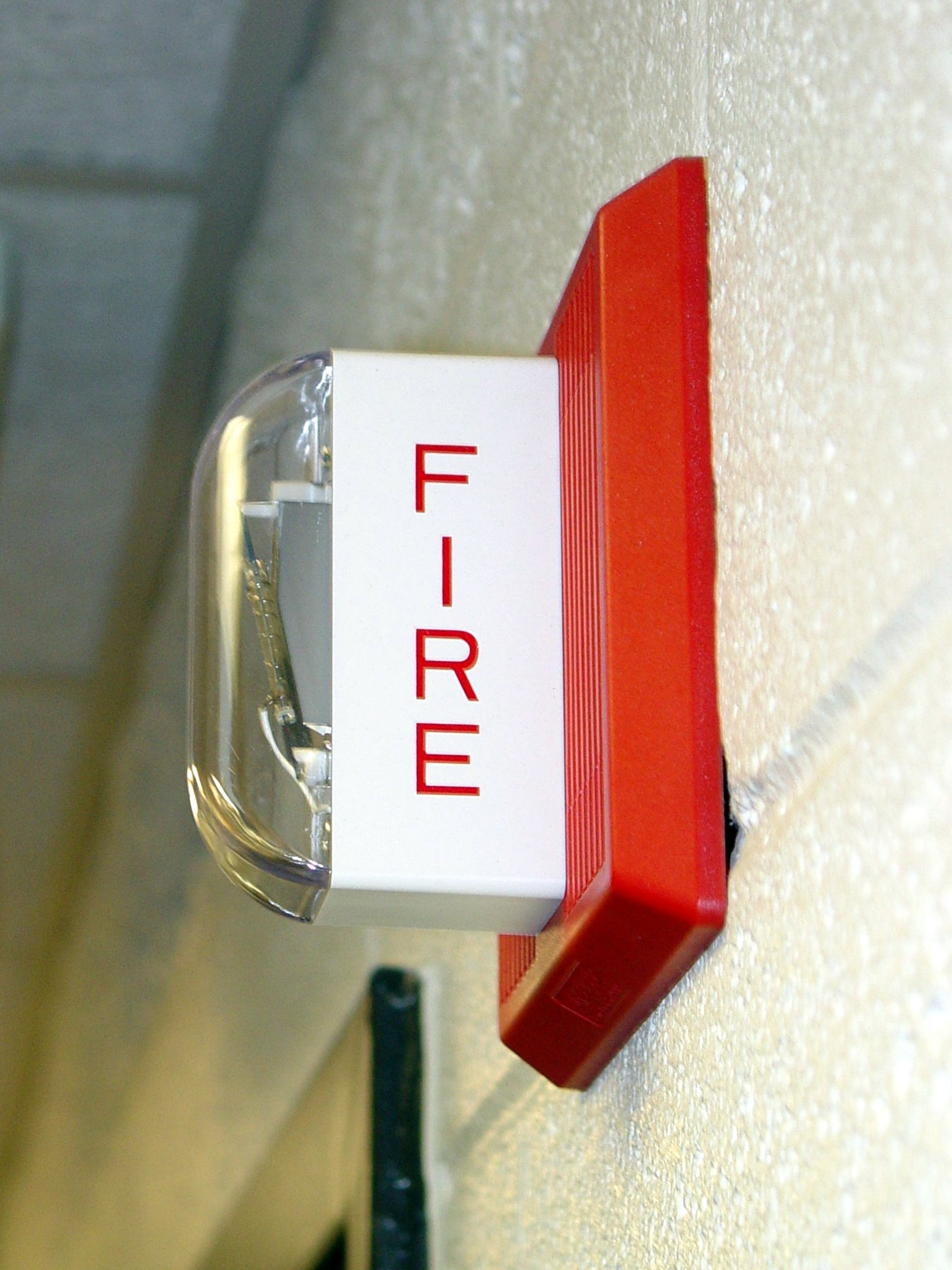
A Wheelock MT horn/strobe with a vertical (LSM) strobe.

The Series MT (Multi-tone) was introduced in 1993. It features eight different tones including Continuous Horn, Code-3 Horn, March Time Horn, Code-3 Tone, Siren, Slow Whoop, Hi-Lo, and Bell. These could be set using DIP switches on the back of the horn. However, most of the tones did not grab the attention of bystanders. The most commonly used tones were Continuous Horn, Code-3 Horn, and March Time Horn. The MT has seen different strobe types over time, including translucent vertical strobes, transparent vertical strobes, and transparent horizontal strobes. The horizontal strobe design was introduced in 2002, and is still used to this day.

=== Series AS ===
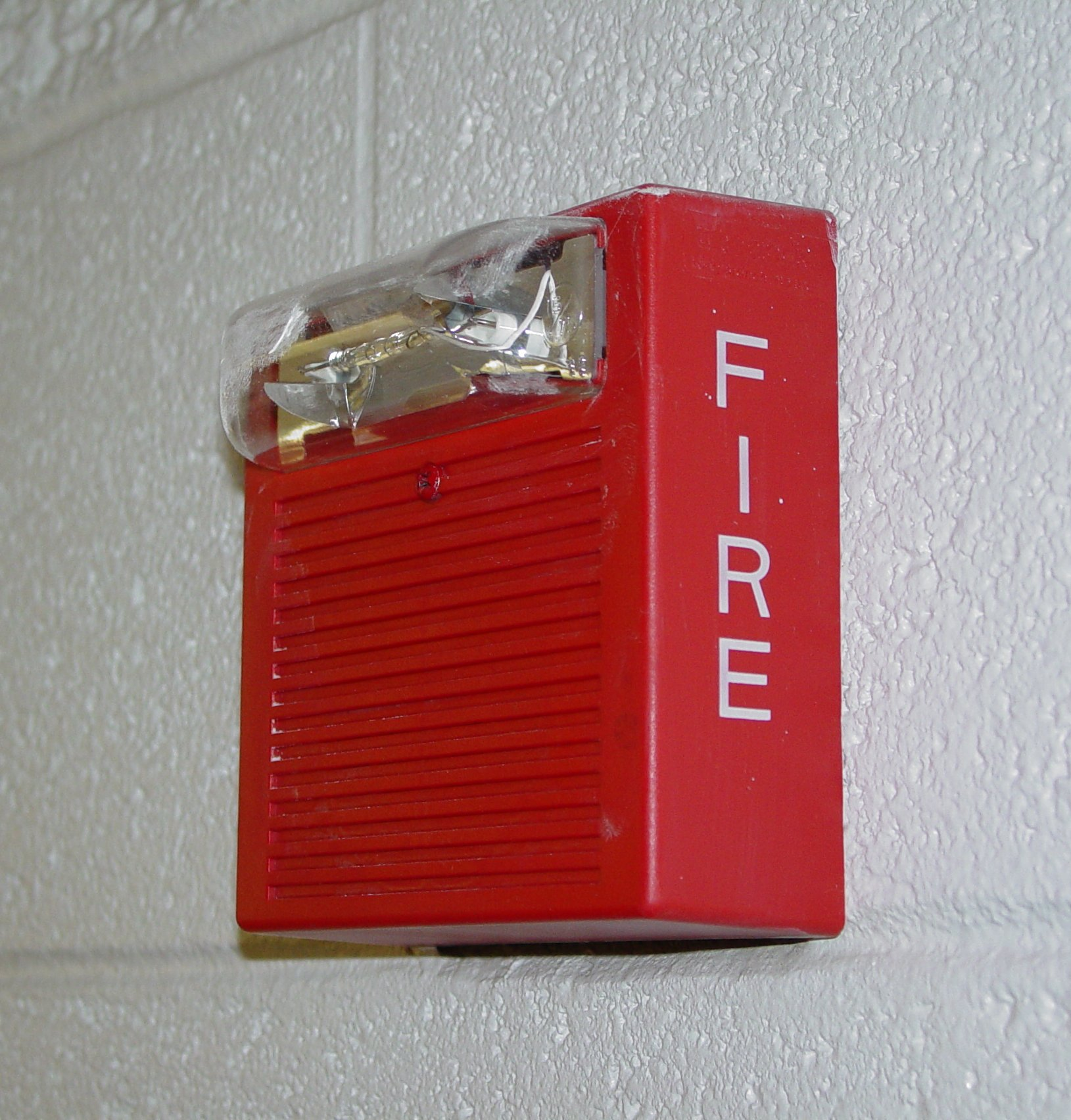
A Wheelock AS horn/strobe

In 1995, Wheelock introduced the AS, a combination horn and strobe. The AS was first created with a vertical position strobe on the right side of the horn, except for 110 candela models, which used a horizontal strobe. In 1997 when the NS was introduced, the strobe on all AS models was moved to the horizontal position. Additionally, Code 3 horn was added to the AS in 1998. In March 2010, the AS was discontinued, with its weatherproof variant, the ASWP, being discontinued and replaced by the Eluxa in late 2024.

=== Series NS ===
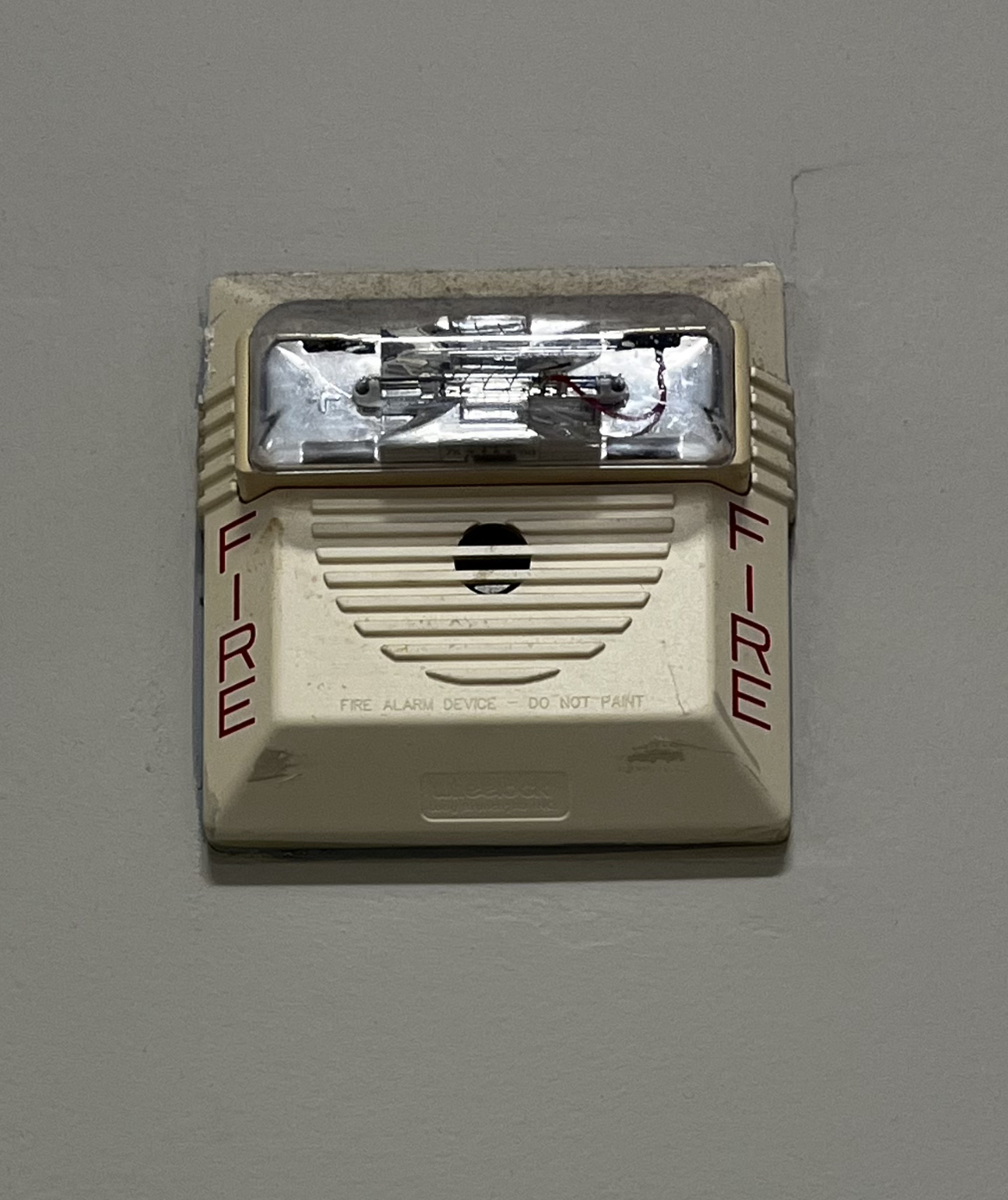
Wheelock NS Horn Strobe

In 1997, Wheelock released the NS series. The NS is similar to the AS, except the design is much less boxy, and the piezoelectric speaker disc is slightly visible through the grill which also has an updated horn. It uses a strobe similar to the RSS line. This series has been discontinued since March 2010, and has been replaced by the Exceder series.

=== Series RSS ===
The RSS strobe replaced the vertical LSM, RS and Syncable SR strobe series, since a horizontal strobe allows for greater coverage. They also introduced the RSSP, a retrofit plate which allows the easy addition of a strobe to older electromechanical horns and bells.

On June 25, 2021, Eaton announced that they would discontinue the indoor RSS series and it was discontinued on December 31, 2021.

=== Series E ===
Series E, is a series of speakers and speaker strobes, released in the 90s, also featuring a strobe similar to the RSS line, this series featured both wall and ceiling devices, there was also chime variants.

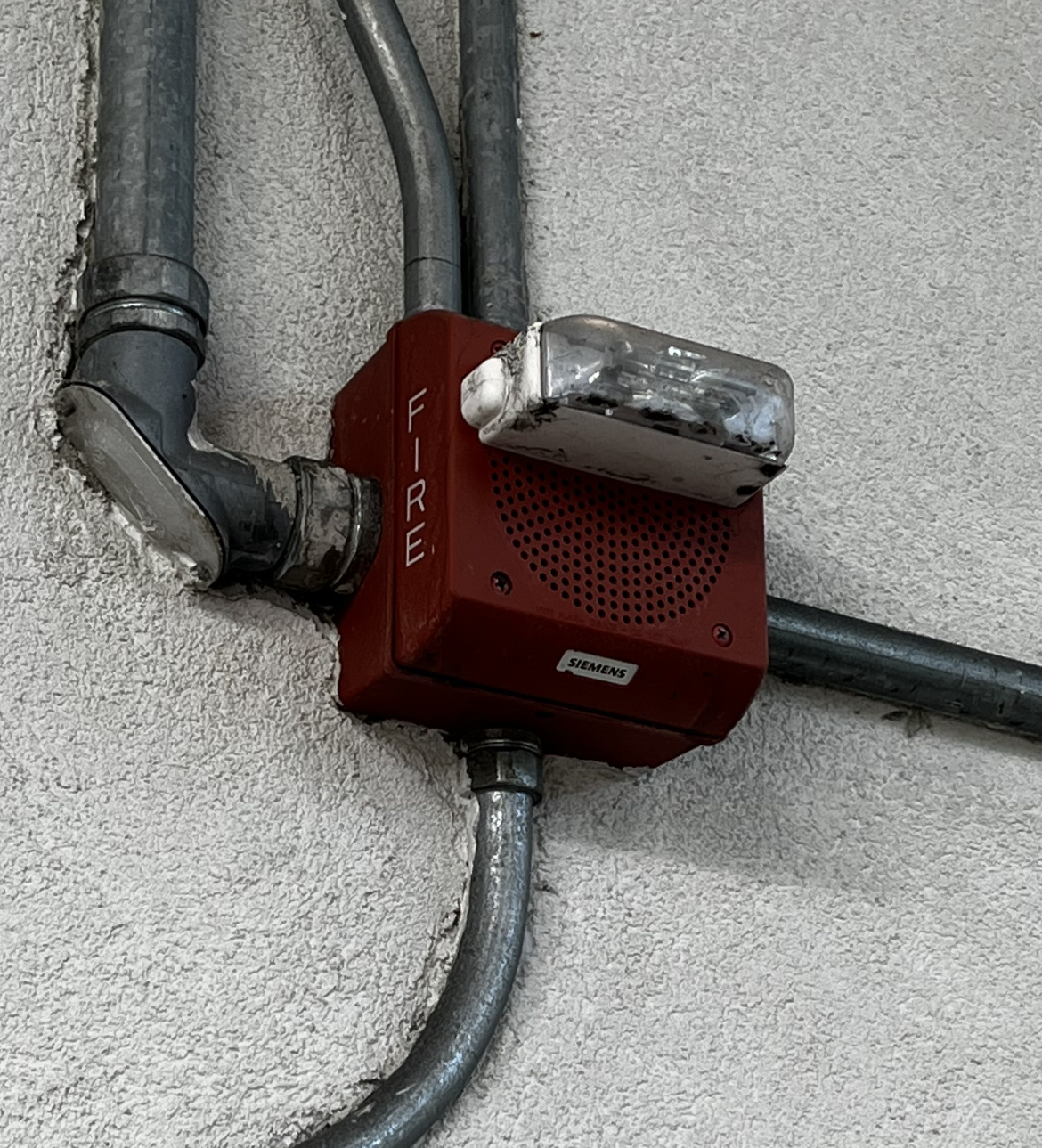
Siemens SET-WP (Wheelock ET70WP) Weatherproof Speaker Strobe

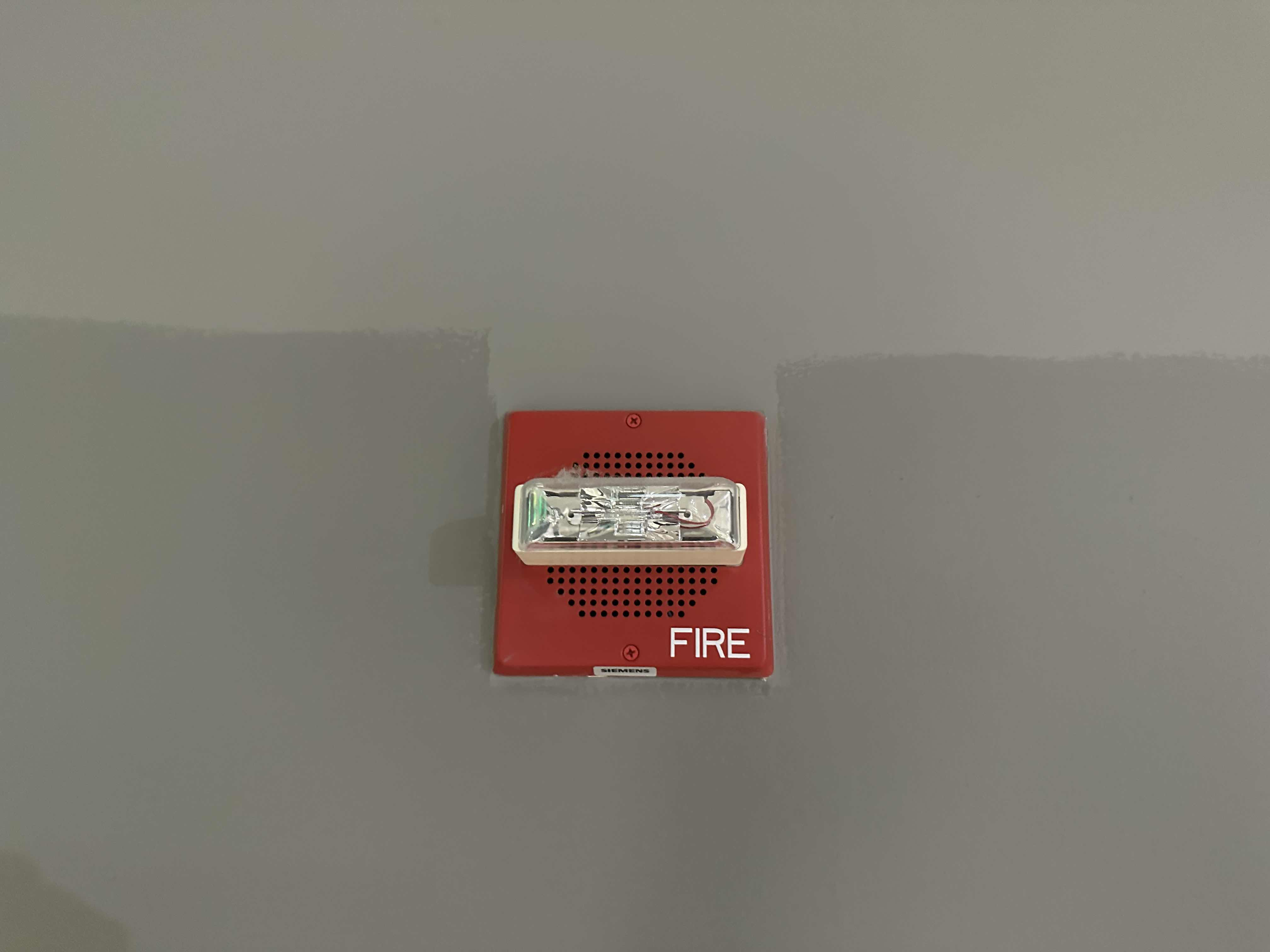
Siemens SEF/SEFH/SET (Wheelock E70/E70H/ET70) Speaker Strobe

=== Z-Series ===
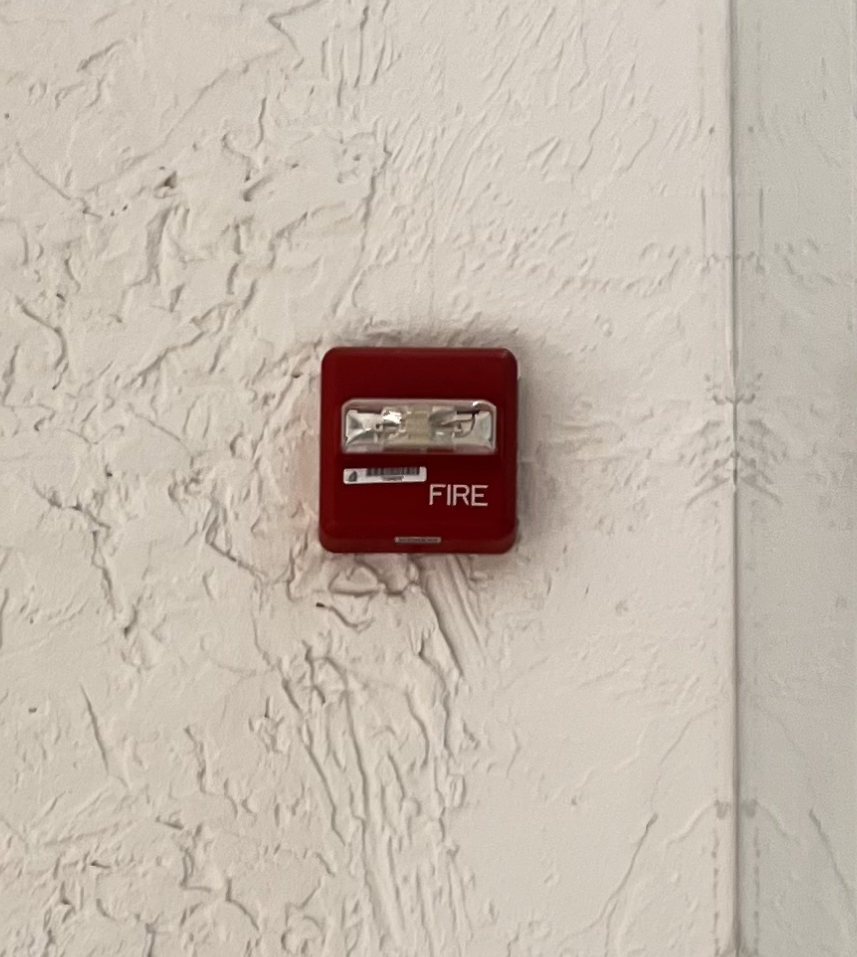
Siemens ZR (Wheelock ZRS) Strobe

In 2006, Wheelock introduced the ZNS, ZRS, and ZNH horn/strobes, remote strobes, and remote horns. The ZNS has the same horn circuitry as the NS. The ZNS and ZRS features a "snap-on" mounting system, which allows the base to be installed before the horn is attached. The Z-series has been discontinued since March 2010, with its successor being the Exceder. However, this lineup was produced exclusively for Siemens AG, under the ZH and ZR series until April 2024.

=== Exceder ===
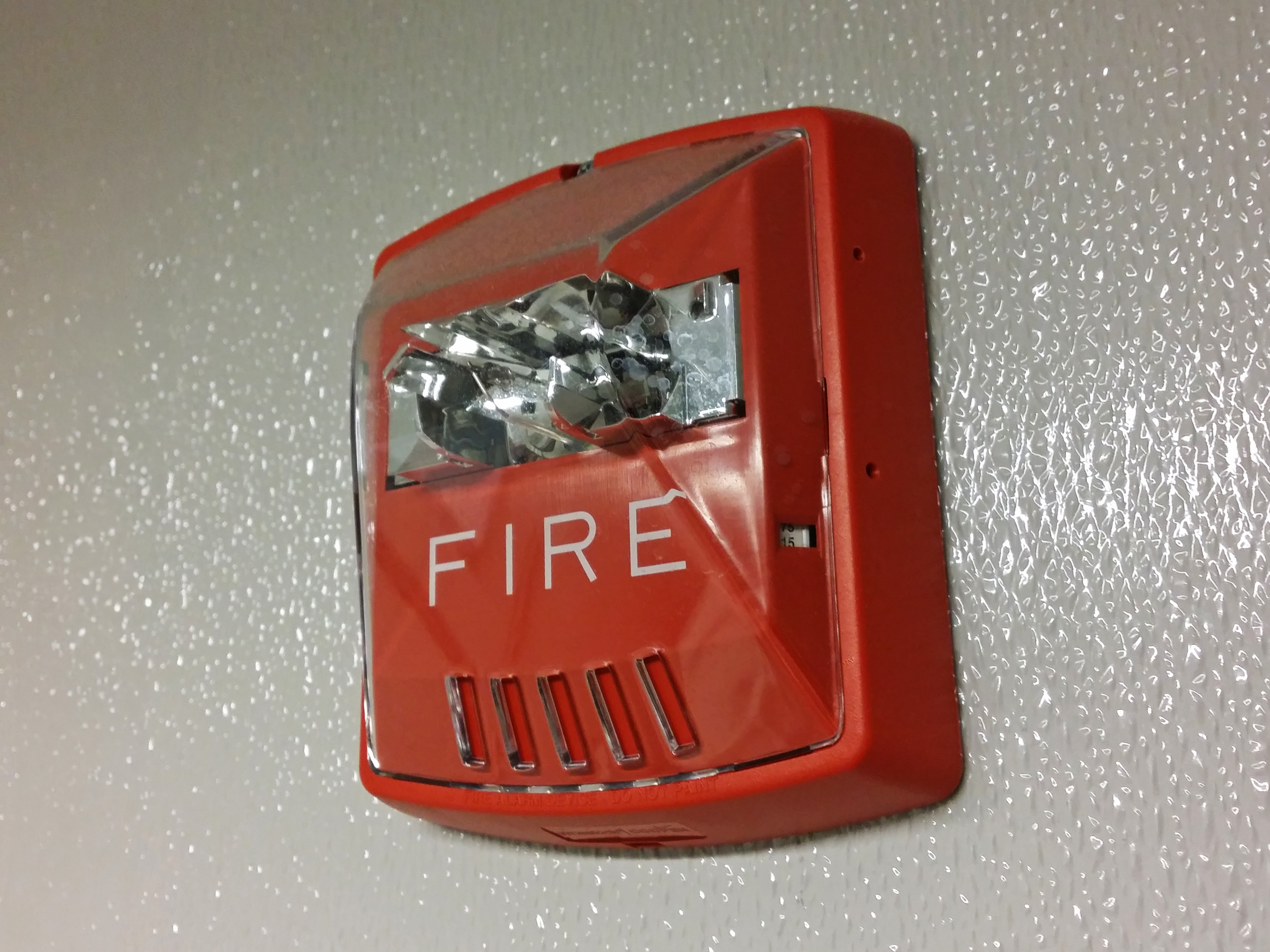
The Wheelock Exceder Horn/Strobe

Wheelock introduced the Exceder series in 2008, consisting of horn/strobes, remote strobes, and remote horns. This product line is essentially a style update of the ZNS. This alarm also features the same "snap-on" mounting system as the ZNS.

==== Exceder LED ====
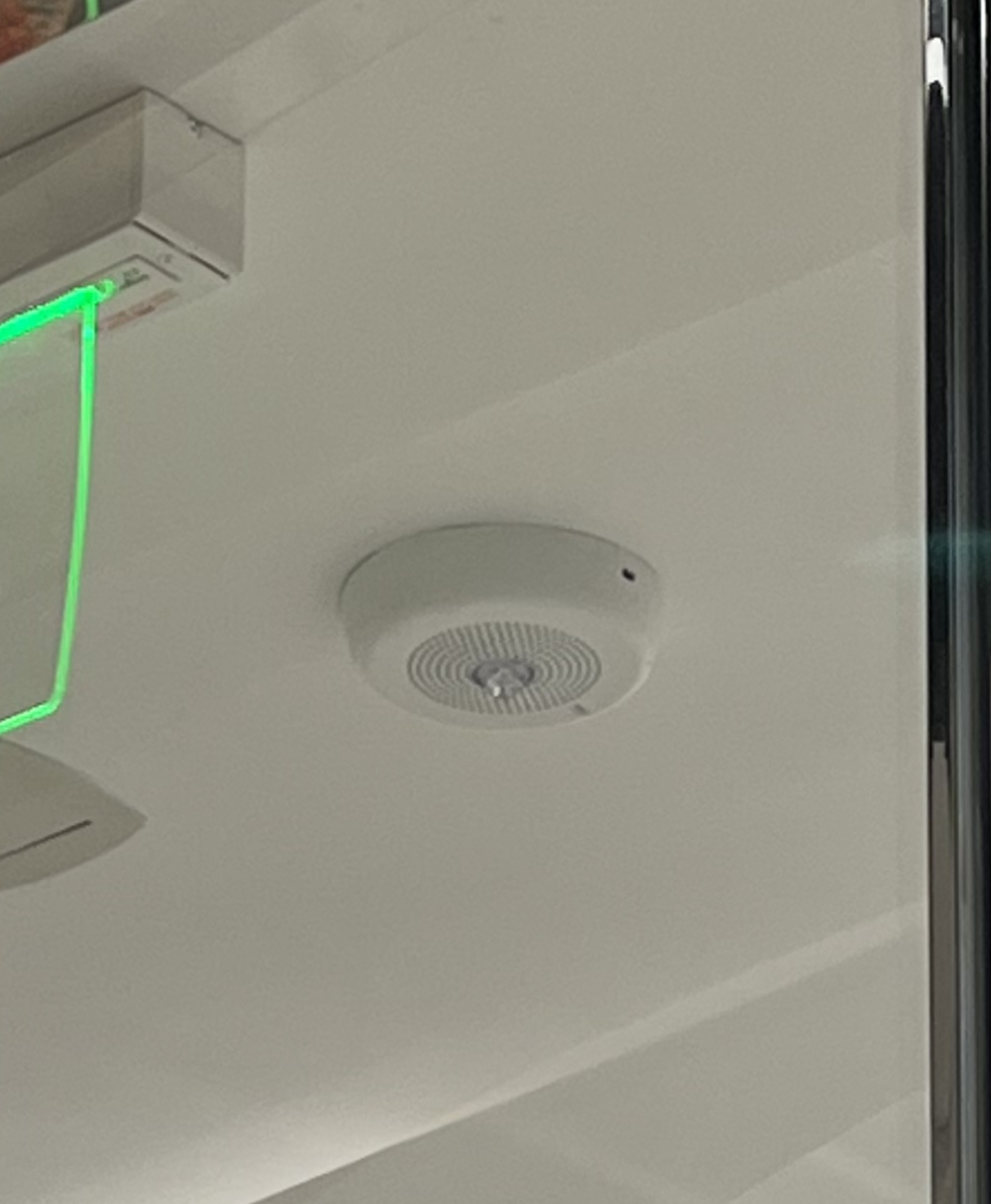
Wheelock LED3 (Siemens SL) Unmarked Speaker Strobe

In 2012, Wheelock updated their Exceder LED series by introducing the industry's first LED notification appliances. The strobes, horns, and horn strobes have compact design, that can be mounted on a single gang electrical backbox, or a trim plate to mount on a dual gang or 4" inch electrical backbox. However it does not feature a "snap-on" mounting system because of the small size of the device. In 2013 Wheelock began making the Exceder LED speaker strobes and the Exceder LED ceiling mount version.

=== Series S8 ===
Wheelock produces the S8-24 series ceiling speakers and speaker strobes. The S8-24 speaker strobes are an 8 inch ceiling speaker, with a strobe on top of the grill. They are xenon multi-candela strobes and are made for indoor areas.

=== Eluxa ===
In 2020, Wheelock announced a new family of notification appliances, named "Eluxa", which shared a similar design from the Exceder LED and LED3 series, however, the notification appliances had their design altered to accommodate a larger LED module, which was engineered to offer strobe intensity ratings of 15, 30, 75, 110, 135, and 185 candela for the wall models, and 15, 30, 75, 110, 150 and 177 for the ceiling mount models, as well as notification appliances being re-engineered to include a mounting plate, like the Exceder Xenon and ZNS/ZRS (ZR/ZH for Siemens). Types of devices include horns, horn strobes, strobes, low frequency sounder strobes, low frequency sounders, speaker strobes and speakers.
