= Manual fire alarm activation =

Button or lever to activate fire alarms

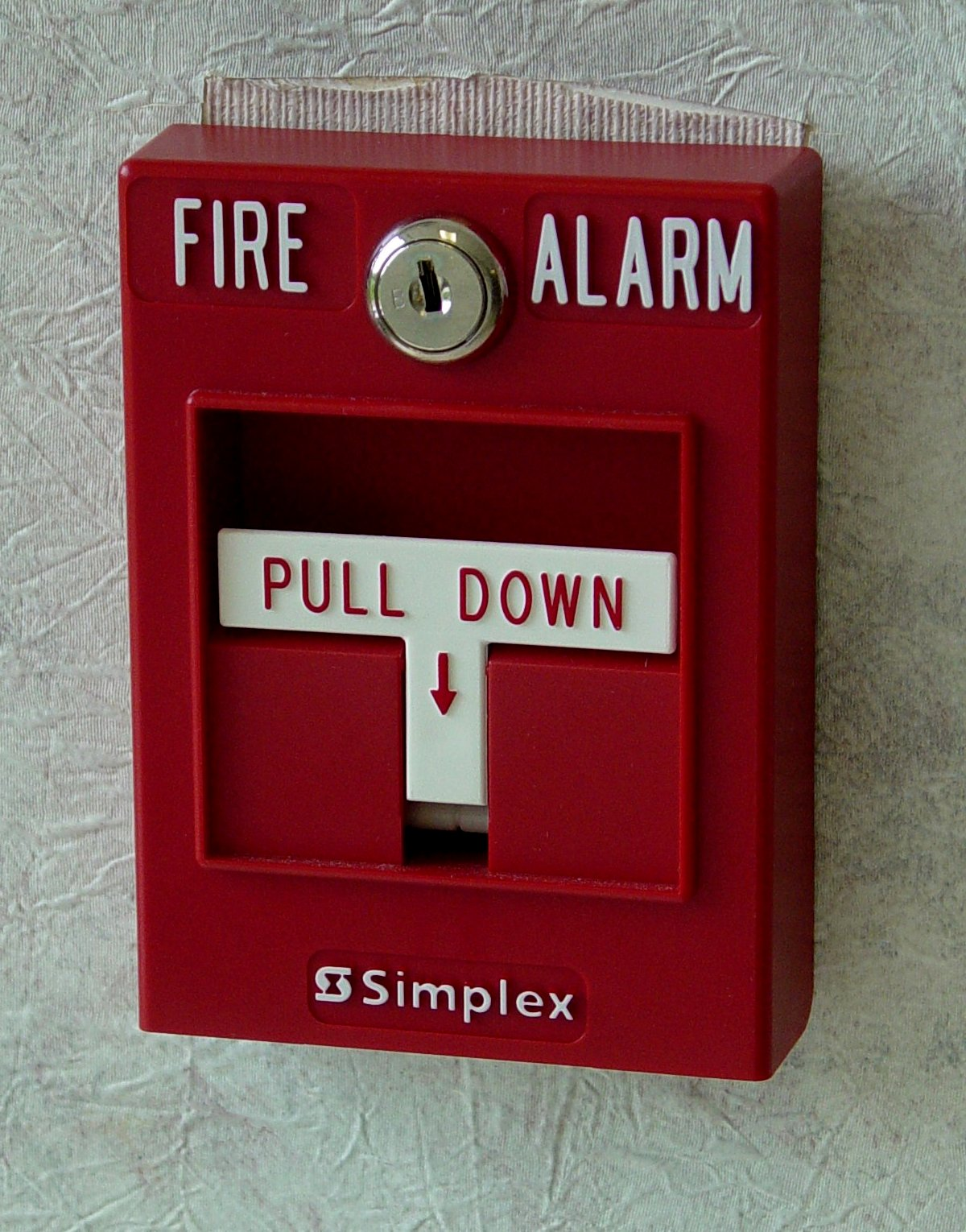
Simplex single action "T-bar" pull station

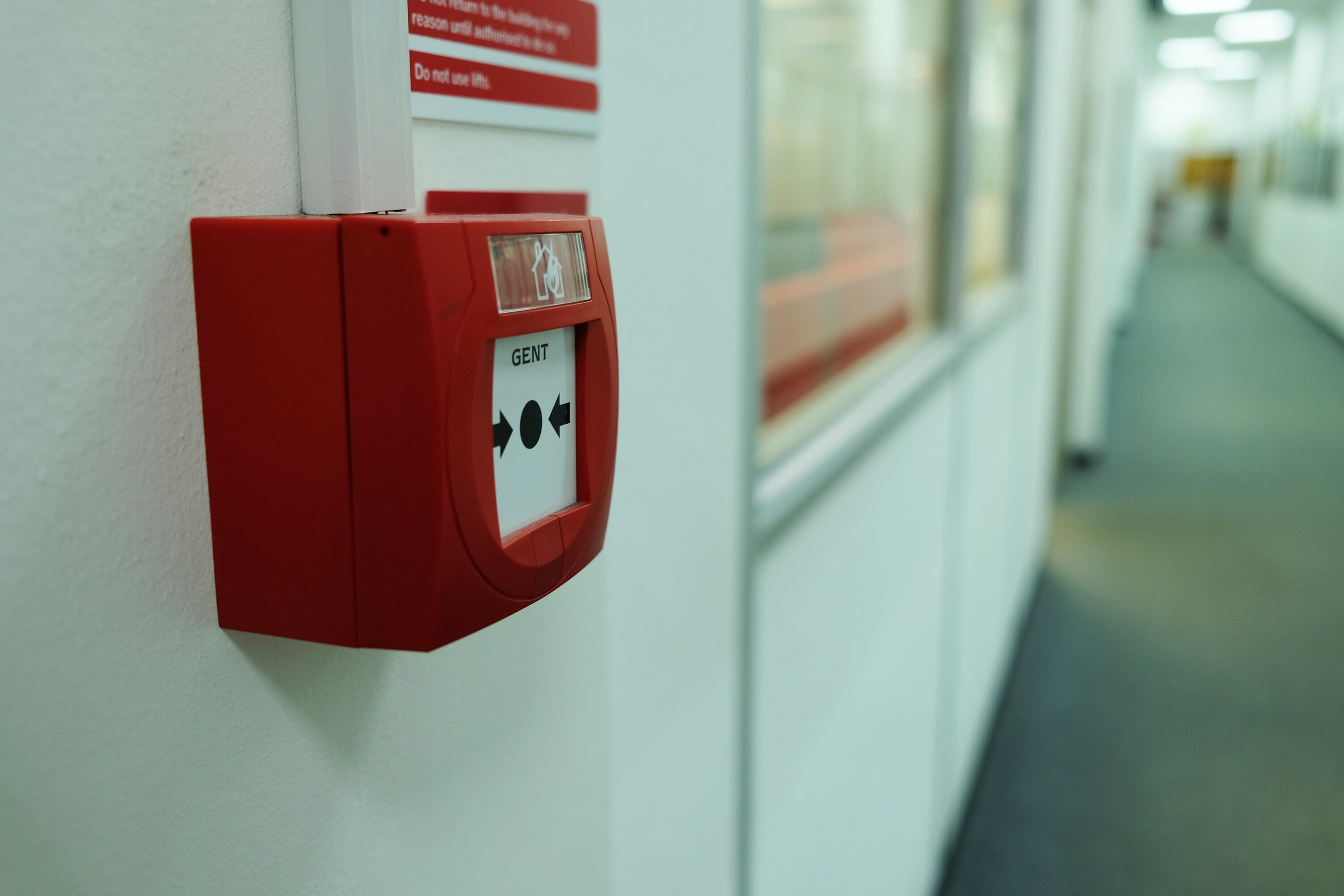
A manual call point in the European Union (EU) with standard EN 54-11

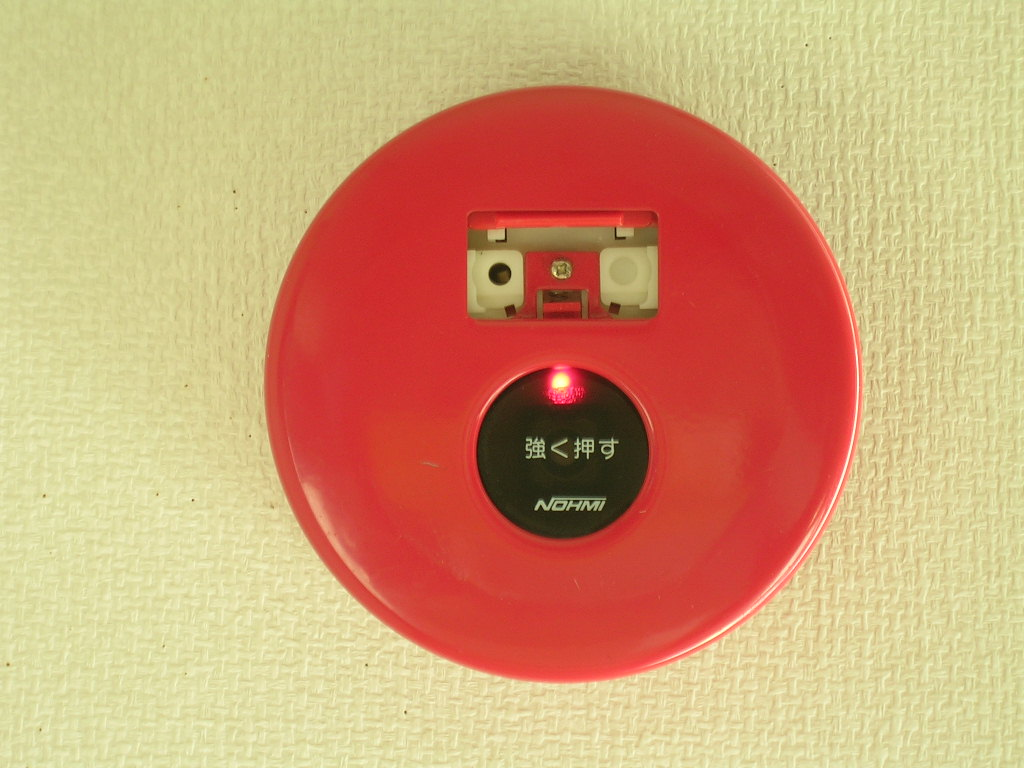
An activated manual call point in Japan. Telephone jacks are visible beneath the open cover.

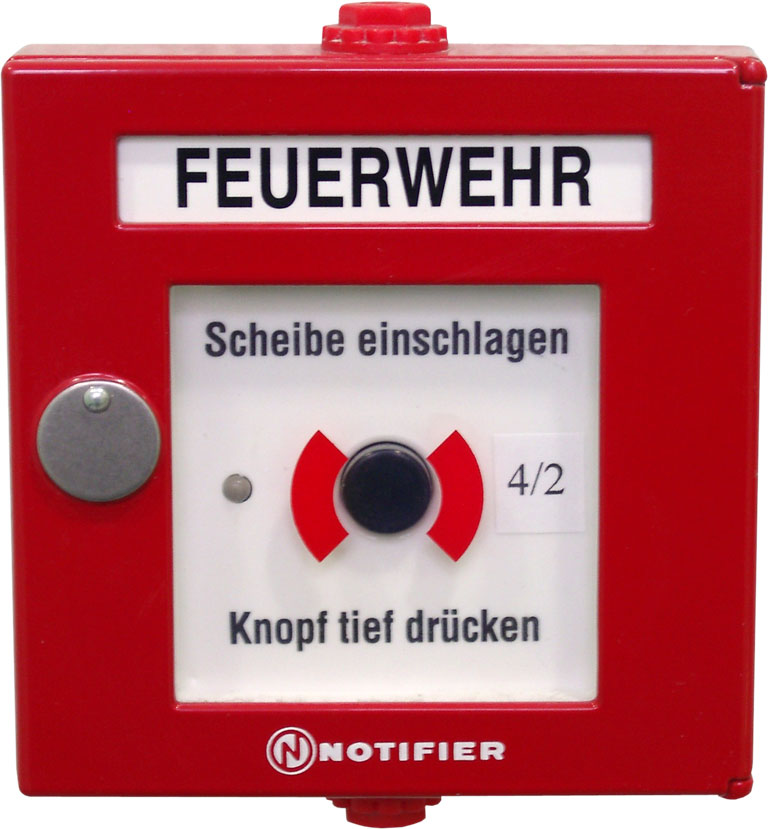
German manual call point with paint from NOTIFIER (Honeywell)

Manual fire alarm activation is the process of triggering a fire alarm through a call point, pull station, or other device. This usually causes the alarm to sound the evacuation signal for the relevant building or zone. Manual fire alarm activation requires human intervention, as distinct from automatic fire alarm activation such as that provided through the use of heat detectors and smoke detectors. It is, however, possible for call points/pull stations to be used in conjunction with automatic detection as part of the overall fire detection and alarm system. Systems in completed buildings tend to be wired in and include a control panel. Wireless activators are common during construction.

When a fire pull station or call point is activated, codes usually require evacuation begin immediately. There are certain exemptions like system maintenance and security lockdowns, where manual activation outside the control panel may be overridden. Security alarms, emergency door releases, industrial fire suppression systems, and hazardous material leak alarms are all examples of specialty systems which are sometimes activated with similar manual initiating devices to a fire alarm. They may be linked to fire alarm systems to varying degrees.

== Fire alarm pull station ==
A fire alarm pull station is an active fire protection device, usually wall-mounted, that, when activated, initiates an alarm on a fire alarm system. This is the most common design in North America. In its simplest form, the user activates the alarm by pulling the handle down, which completes a circuit and locks the handle in the activated position, sending an alarm to the fire alarm control panel. After operation, most fire alarm pull stations must be restored to the ready position using a special tool or key for the panel to be reset. Primitive manual stations, requiring only a single action or hand motion to activate, can be subject to unwanted activation by jarring or accidental contact. Early strategies to cope with this problem included requiring the operator to break a pane of glass to release an internal spring-operated mechanism. Manual pull stations that require two hand motions, such as lift up and pull down, or push in and pull down, have since replaced the break-glass and single-action models in many modern installations.

=== Coded pull stations ===
In the past, pull stations controlled the entire system. These coded pull stations were much bigger than modern pulls and had a code wheel in them. They had a gear mechanism that was wound up when the station was pulled, and (unlike modern pull stations) the handle did not stay down. The gears would turn a small wheel with a specific number of teeth, which determined the coding. The teeth would push up on a contact, which would open and close a circuit, pulsing the code to the bells or horns. This code was used by building security to determine where the alarm was originating from. For example, consider a pull station in the fourth-floor elevator lobby of an office building with a code of 5-3-1. When the station was pulled, the security officers in the building would look up 5-3-1 in a master list of codes. After finding the location of the pull, they should check to see if there is a real fire. If there was, they would evacuate the building and call the fire department.

Antique Holtzer-Cabot coded pull station

System tests could be conducted in one of two ways: In a coded pull station, there is either a test hole on the front (usually activated with an Allen wrench) or a test switch on the inside. Turning the switch one way causes the notification appliances to sound continuous (or in the case of single-stroke bells, ding once). Turning it the other way and then activating the pull allows a silent test to be done in which the station's mechanical parts are checked to ensure proper function. Once pulled, the station would do at least four rounds of code before resetting itself. Coded pulls were typically used in new fire alarm systems until roughly the 1950s, and then occasionally into the 1970s. Until the early 1990s, some panels were made with an extra zone to accommodate any existing coded pull stations. Nowadays, coded pull stations are rarely seen in working fire alarm systems.

=== Modern pull stations ===
Many modern fire alarm pull stations are single-action and only require the user to pull down a handle to sound the alarm. Other fire alarm pull stations are dual-action, and as such require the user to perform a second task before pulling down, such as lifting or pushing in a panel on the station or breaking a glass panel with an attached hammer. Perhaps the most recognizable pull station is the "T-bar"-style pull station, so named because the handle is shaped like the letter "T". This style is manufactured by many companies, most notably SimplexGrinnell.

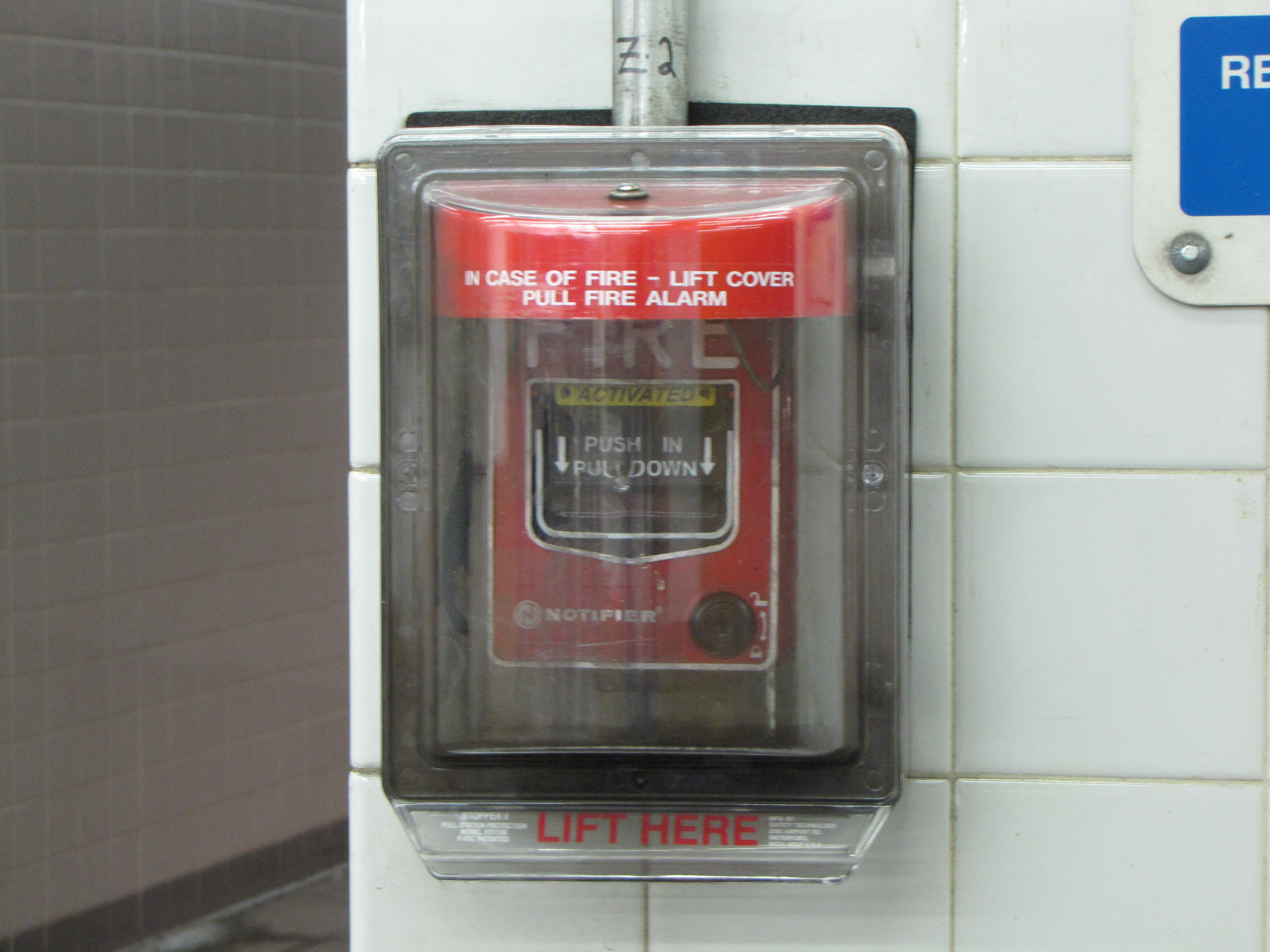
Activated Notifier NBG-12 pull station underneath a Stopper cover

Resetting a fire alarm pull station after it has been operated normally requires building personnel or emergency responders to open the station using a key, which often is either a hex key or a more traditional key. Opening the station causes the handle to go back to its original position, allowing the alarm to be reset from the fire alarm control panel after the station has been closed.

In some places, particularly at college dormitories and schools, students deliberately set off fire alarms as a prank. These false alarms can result in alarm fatigue if they occur repeatedly, causing occupants to dismiss the importance of alarms or completely ignore them. In areas where false alarms are a recurring problem, pull stations may be covered with a clear plastic cover (sold under the "Stopper" trade name) that will cause people to notice the person by sounding an alarm when tampered with or opened, attracting attention towards the fire alarm. The plastic covers may also be used to help prevent accidental pulls caused by bumping a pull station or accidental pulls by small children. Some covers lack internal alarms and are just used to help prevent bumping the pull station. Because of these and other issues, intentionally setting off a fire alarm when there is no fire or other emergency is illegal in most jurisdictions.

== Manual call points ==
In Europe, Australia, New Zealand and Asia, pull stations are generally not used; instead, a manual call point is used, which is usually referred to as an MCP, call point, break-glass point, or Fire Point within the fire protection industry and as a "transmitter" in Japan. They are used to allow building occupants to signal that a fire or other emergency exists within the building. When activated they will raise a plastic flag out of the top to tell which alarm was activated. They are usually connected to a central fire alarm panel which is in turn connected to an alarm system in the building, and often to a local fire brigade dispatcher as well. The first modern MCP arrived in Europe in 1972 and was developed by KAC.

Manual call points are used to initiate an alarm signal and operate using a simple button press or when glass is broken revealing a button. They can form part of a manual alarm system or an automatic alarm system. There will be an indicator on the monitoring unit for visual indication to locate the call point easily, and there should be a visual identifier of the unit which triggered the alarm, typically a mechanical flag that operates on a latch and must be manually reset, e.g. by a key.

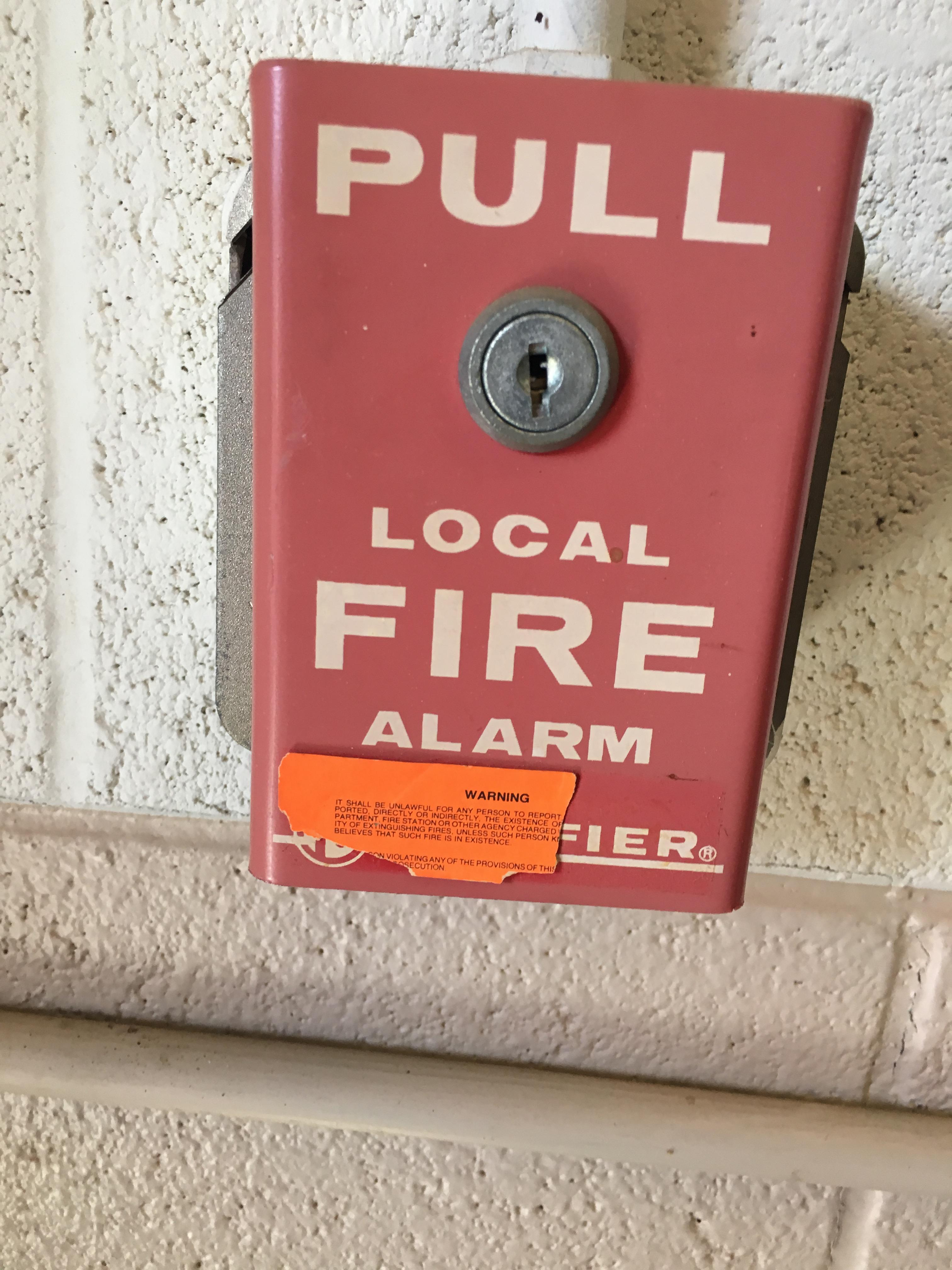
A Notifier pull station at Oklahoma State University. The orange sticker on it warns would-be pranksters of the consequences for false alarms.

Previously, the old British standard did not allow hinged covers and plastic resettable elements. Plastic elements must have the same printing as the EN 54 glass.

In the US and Canada, alarm initiating devices with button-like designs are sometimes used in high-hazard occupancies. The NFPA 72 standard uses the term Alarm Box, which could encompass a number of initiation mechanisms. A few manual call points have been approved to UL/UL Canada standards. At the time of this writing, the pull station is still the most prominent design in this part of the world.

A report by the UK-based Building Research Establishment (BRE) stated "there is a commonly held view that equipment designed to meet the European EN54 Fire detection and fire alarm systems standard cannot be used within an installation designed to the US National Fire Alarm Code, NFPA 72." In actuality, "there appears to be no requirement in NFPA 72 that precludes the use of manual call points..."

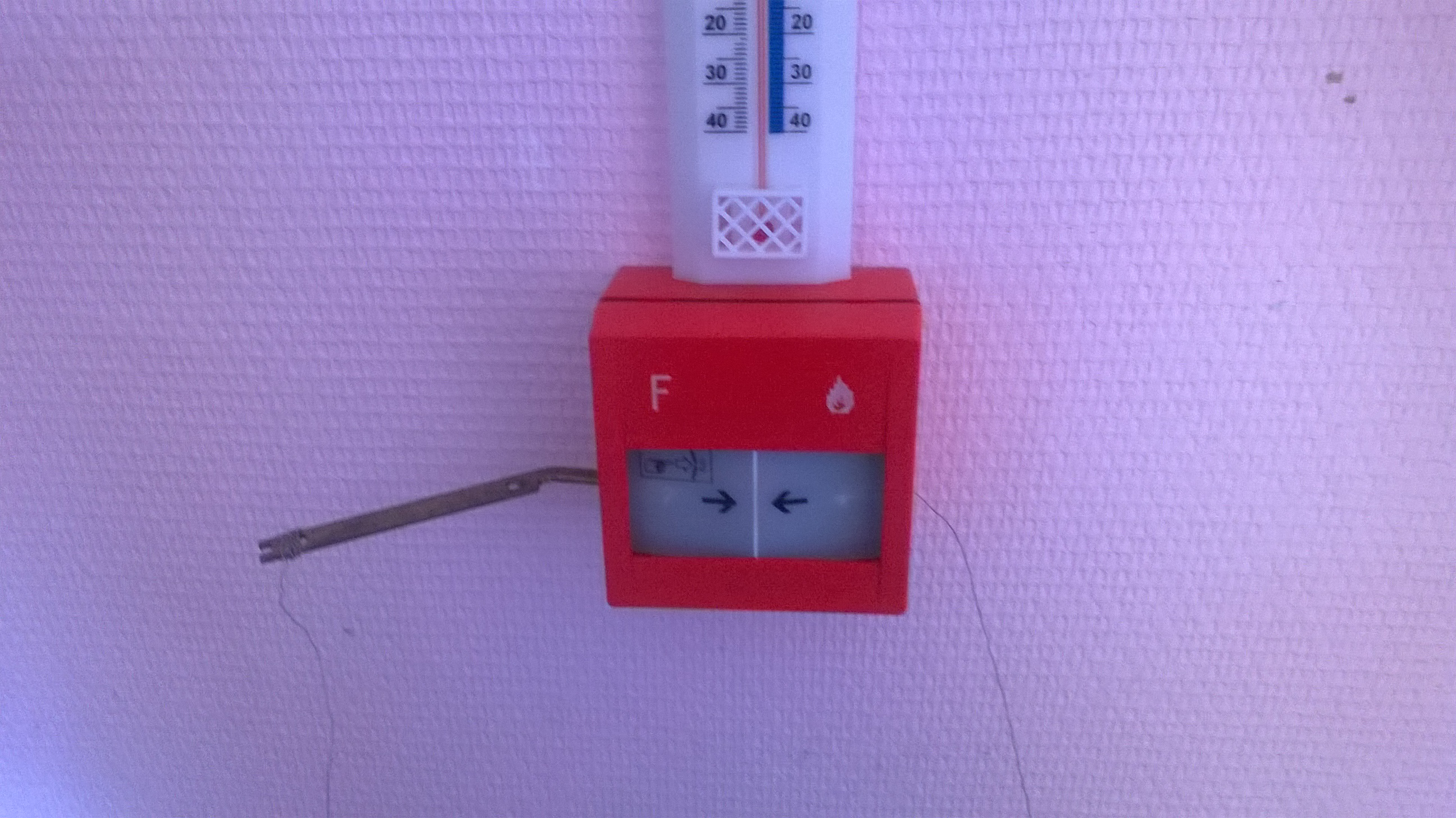
An older Legrand Manual call point. This call point uses a lever-shaped key to reset.

== Temporary MCPs ==
It is becoming increasingly common in the UK and Europe for wireless MCPs to be used in temporary environments such as construction sites. These typically provide the same level of protection as a standard wired fire alarm installation, but can be moved around as needed in the changing environment of a building under construction without the need for specialist electrician installation. They often combine call point functionality with sounder and strobe functions for ease of installation.

Such systems typically operate a similar structure to a standard wired fire alarm network, in that Manual Call Points may be mixed with automatic fire detection in the form of heat detection and smoke detection (often specially designed to be dust resistant, due to the increased likelihood of dust on a construction site) and can be connected to a monitoring base station unit. This unit provides visual identification of the triggering unit in any alarm, and should also be able to monitor radio signal strength (which may change as the build progresses) and battery life.

Due to their use for life inherent purposes, radio receivers used in such systems should be of Category 1 standard.

Systems for use during construction can be wireless or mechanical. In the United Kingdom, interconnecting wireless systems are recommended for timber-framed construction.

== European Standards ==
Fire detection and alarm products placed on the market within the European Union must, following Regulation (EU) No 305/2011, conform to the European harmonized technical standard EN 54 Fire Detection and Fire Alarm Systems.

EN 54 part 11 is the section of the mandatory standard relating to manual call points.

European Committee for Standardization (CEN, French: Comité Européen de Normalisation) is responsible for the development and maintenance of the standard, as part of its remit for developing harmonized European standards for free movement of goods in the European Union countries.

The EN 54 certification of each device has to be issued annually, and for products of this nature must be issued by a notified body following the stringent testing procedures outlined within the standard.

If an EN 54 certificate is over one year old, it has expired and it is not a valid certificate. Manufacturers can not sell or install the device with expired certification in any country of the European Union.

== See also ==
- Fire safety
