= Fire alarm system =

Building system designed to warn of a fire

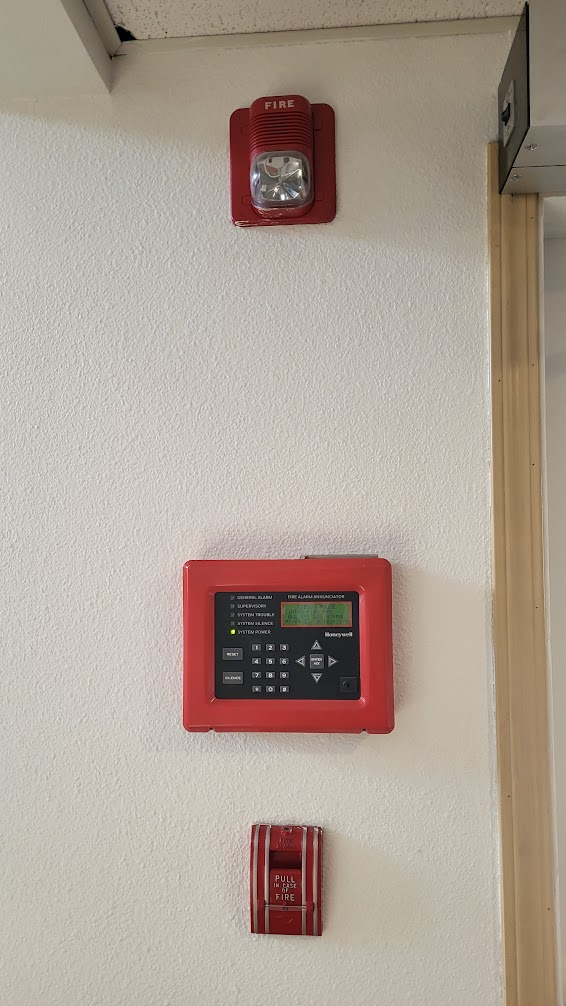
A fire alarm horn strobe (System Sensor SpectrAlert), remote annunciator (Honeywell RA-1000R) and pull station (Edwards 270-SPO), connected together in a fire alarm system.

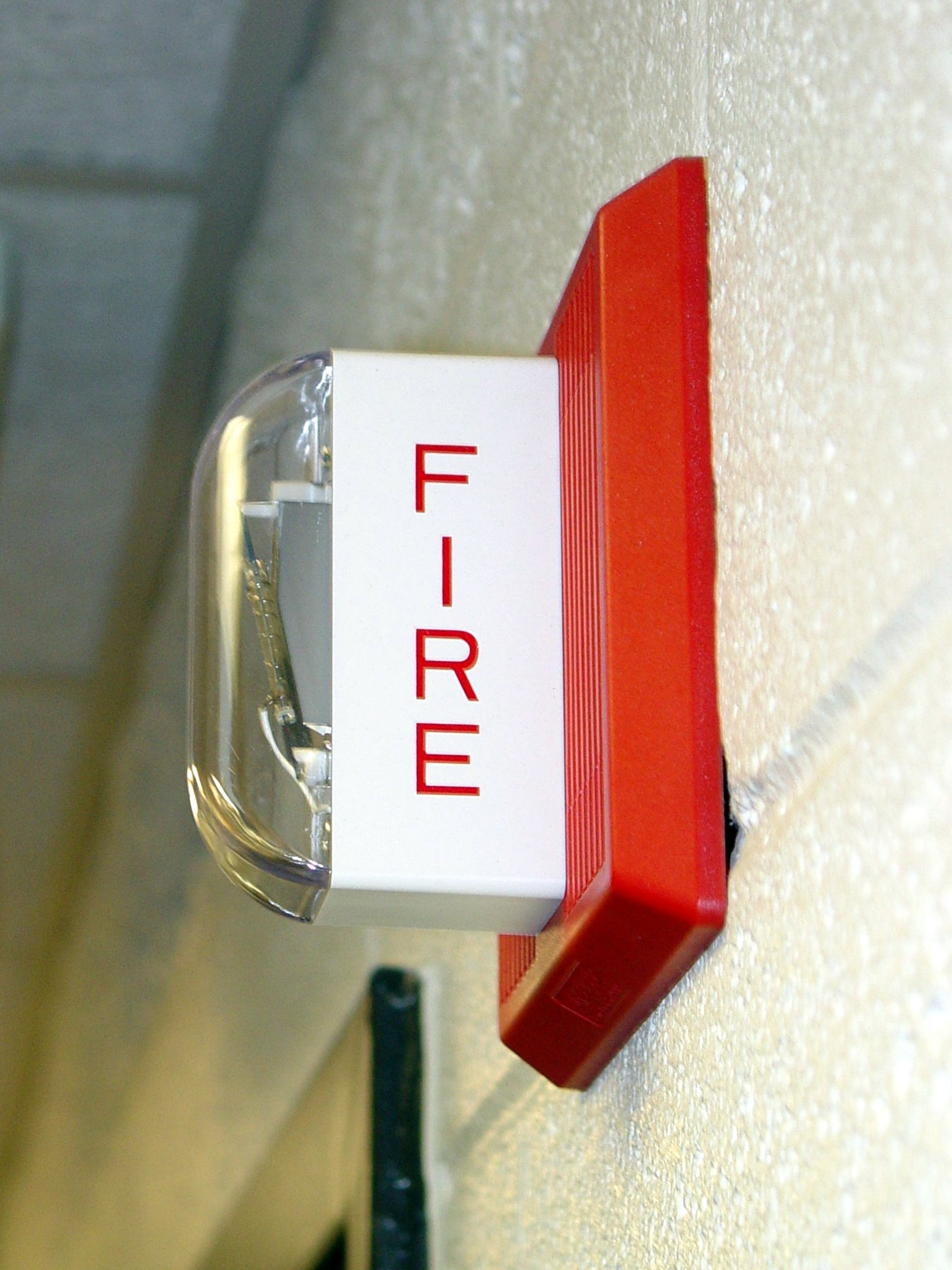
A fire alarm notification appliance (Wheelock MT-24-LSM) as widely used under North American standards

A fire alarm system, often just called a fire alarm, is a building system designed to detect, alert occupants, and alert emergency forces of the presence of fire, smoke, carbon monoxide, or other fire-related emergencies. Fire alarm systems are required in most commercial buildings. They may include smoke detectors, heat detectors, and manual fire alarm activation devices (pull stations). All components of a fire alarm system are connected to a fire alarm control panel. Fire alarm control panels are usually found in an electrical or panel room. Fire alarm systems generally use visual and audio signalization to warn the occupants of the building. Some fire alarm systems may also disable elevators, which are unsafe to use during a fire under most circumstances.

== Design ==
Fire alarm systems are designed after fire protection requirements in a location are established, which is usually done by referencing the minimum levels of security mandated by the appropriate model building code, insurance agencies, and other authorities. A fire alarm designer will detail specific components, arrangements, and interfaces necessary to accomplish these requirements. Equipment specifically manufactured for these purposes is selected, and standardized installation methods are anticipated during the design. There are several commonly referenced standards for fire protection requirements, including:

- ISO 7240-14, the international standard for the design, installation, commissioning, and service of fire detection and fire alarm systems in and around a building. This standard was published in August 2013.
- NFPA 72, The National Fire Alarm Code, an established and widely used installation standard from the United States. In Canada, the Underwriters' Laboratories of Canada or ULC provides fire system installation standards.
- TS 54 -14 is a technical specification (CEN/TS) for fire detection and fire alarm systems (Part 14: Guidelines for planning, design, installation, commissioning, use, and maintenance). Technical Committee CEN/TC72 has prepared this document as part of the EN 54 series of standards. This standard was published in October 2018.

There are national codes in each European country for planning, design, installation, commissioning, use, and maintenance of fire detection systems with additional requirements that are mentioned on TS 54 -14:

- Germany, VdS 2095
- Italy, UNI 9795
- France, NF S61-936
- Spain, UNE 23007-14
- United Kingdom, BS 5839 Part 1

Across Oceania, the following standards outline the requirements, test methods, and performance criteria for fire detection control and indicating equipment utilised in building fire detection and fire alarm systems:

- Australia AS 1603.4 (superseded), AS 4428.1 (superseded), and AS 7240.2:2018.

== Parts ==
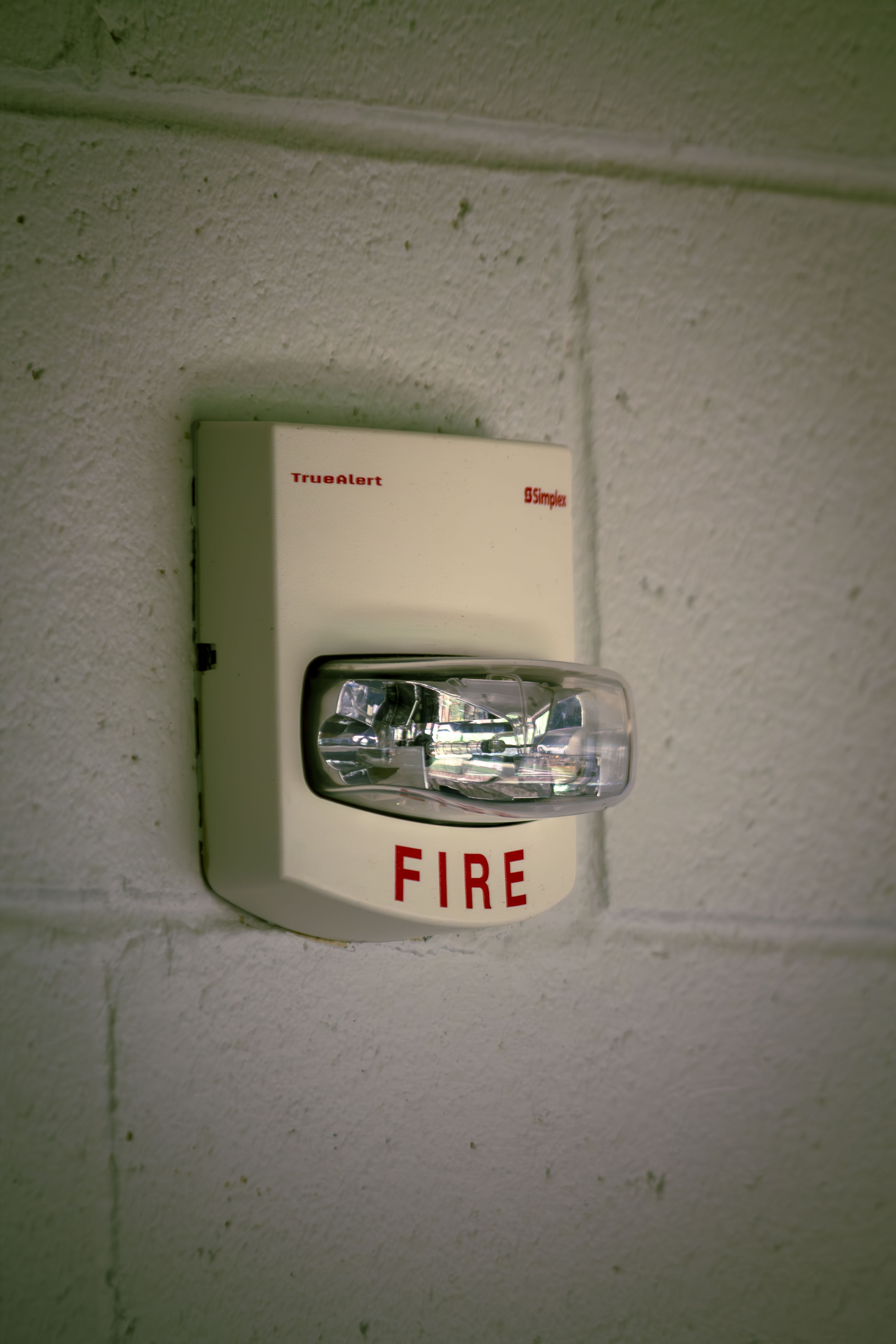
A Simplex TrueAlert fire alarm strobe

A Honeywell DeltaNet FS90 fire alarm control panel

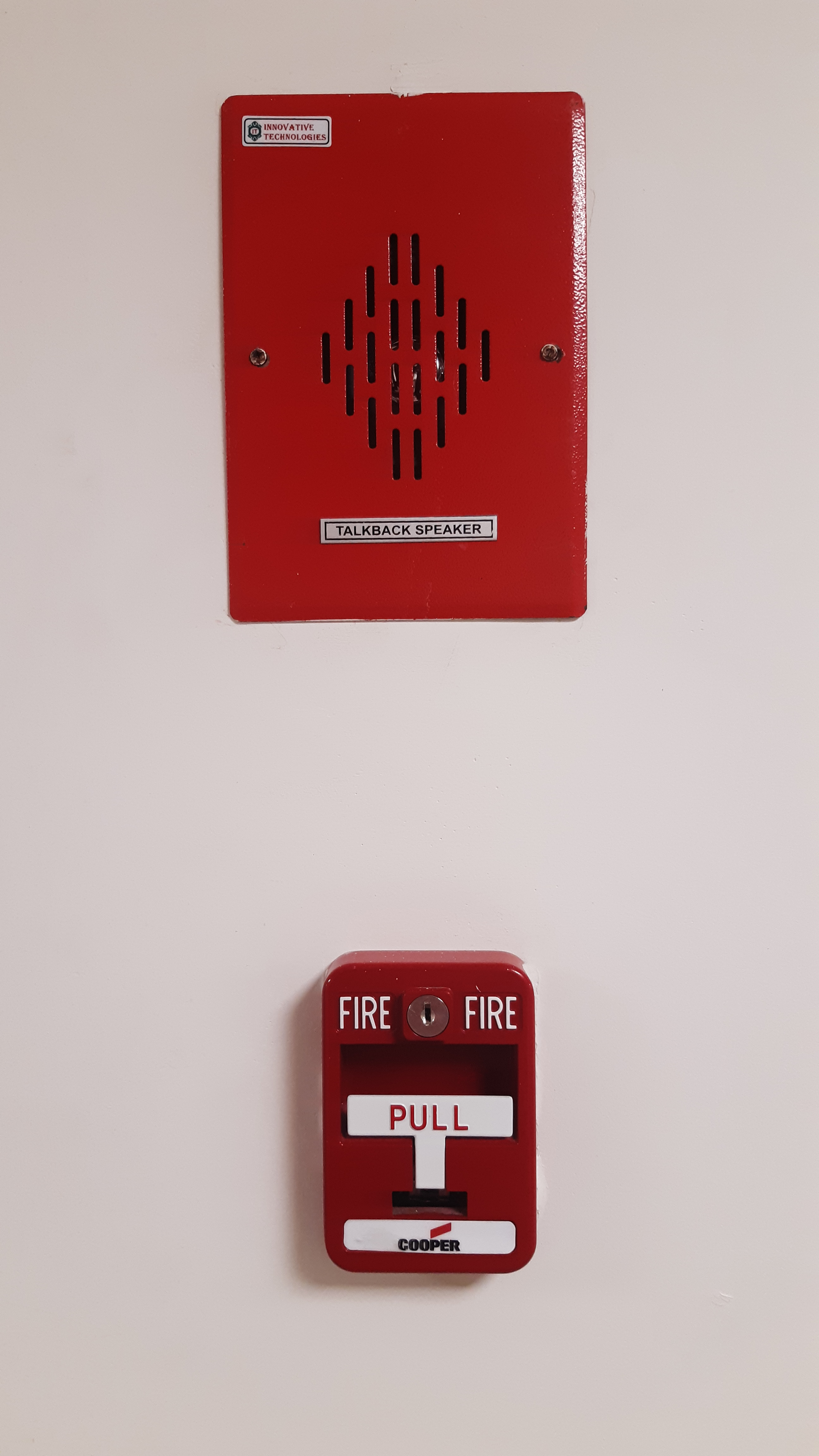
Fire alarm speaker and pull station

Fire alarm systems are composed of several distinct parts:

- Fire alarm control panel (FACP), or fire alarm control unit (FACU): This component, the hub of the system, monitors inputs and system integrity, controls outputs, and transmits information.
- Remote annunciator: a device that connects directly to the panel; the annunciator's main purpose is to allow emergency personnel to view the system status and take command from outside the electrical room the panel is located in. Usually, annunciators are installed by the front door, the door the fire department responds by, or in a fire command center. Annunciators typically have the same commands as those available from the panel's LCD screen, although some annunciators allow for full system control.
- Primary power supply: Commonly, a commercial power utility supplies a non-switched 120 or 240-volt alternating current source. A dedicated branch circuit is connected to the fire alarm system and its constituents in non-residential applications. "Dedicated branch circuits" should not be confused with "Individual branch circuits" which supply energy to a single appliance.
- Secondary (backup) power supplies: Sealed lead-acid storage batteries or other emergency sources, including generators, are used to supply energy during a primary power failure. The batteries can be either inside the bottom of the panel or inside a separate battery box installed near the panel.
- Initiating devices: These components act as inputs to the fire alarm control unit and are manually or automatically activated. Examples include pull stations, heat detectors, duct detectors, and smoke detectors.
- Fire alarm notification appliance: This component uses energy supplied from the fire alarm system or other stored energy source to inform the proximate persons of the need to take action, usually to evacuate. This is done using a variety of audio and visual means, ranging from pulsing incandescent lights, flashing strobe lights, horns, sirens, chimes, bells, loudspeakers, or a combination of these devices.
- Building safety interfaces: This interface allows the fire alarm system to control aspects of the built environment, prepare the building for fire, and control the spread of smoke fumes by influencing air movement, lighting, process control, human transport, and availability of exits.

== Initiating devices ==
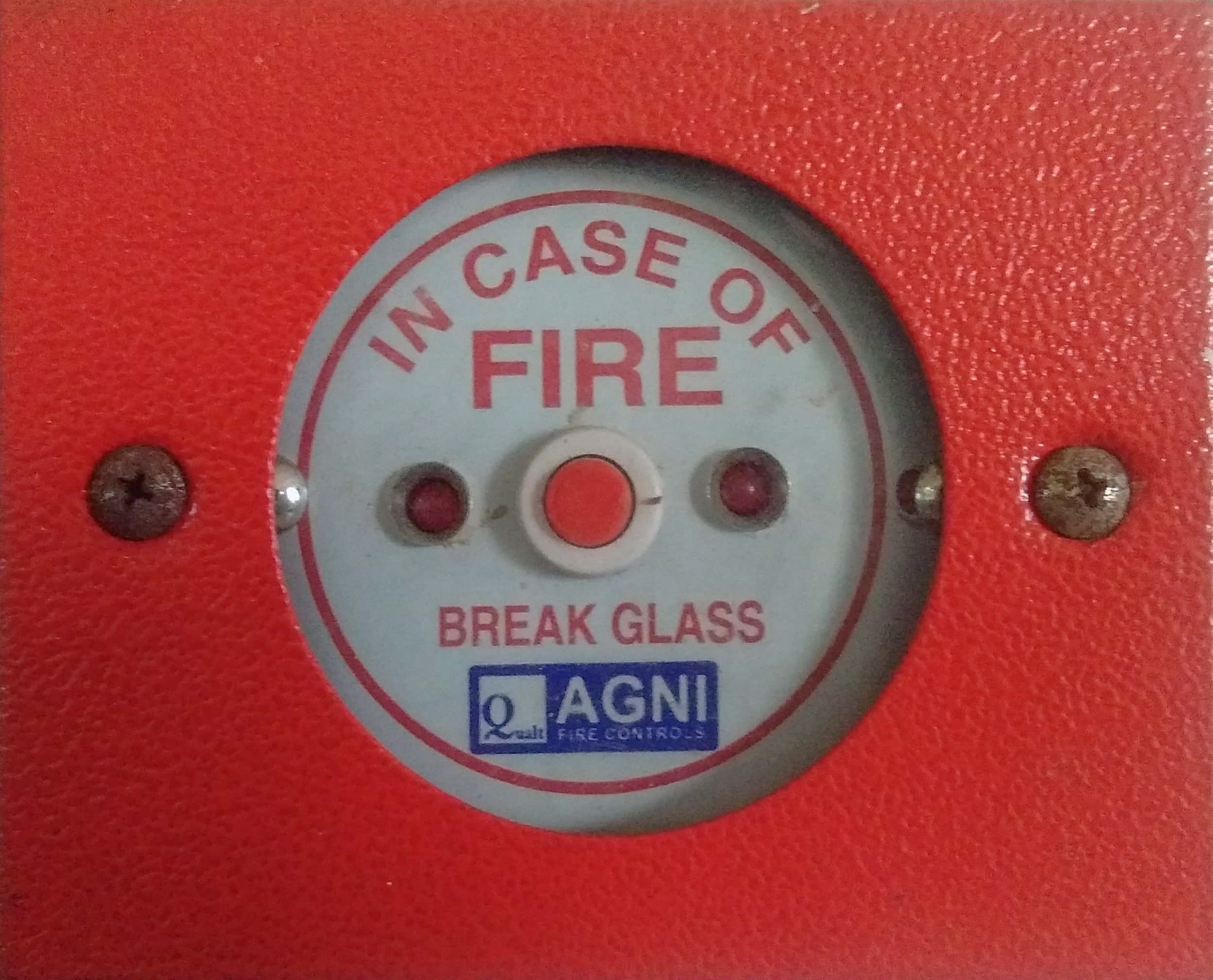
Fire alarm box

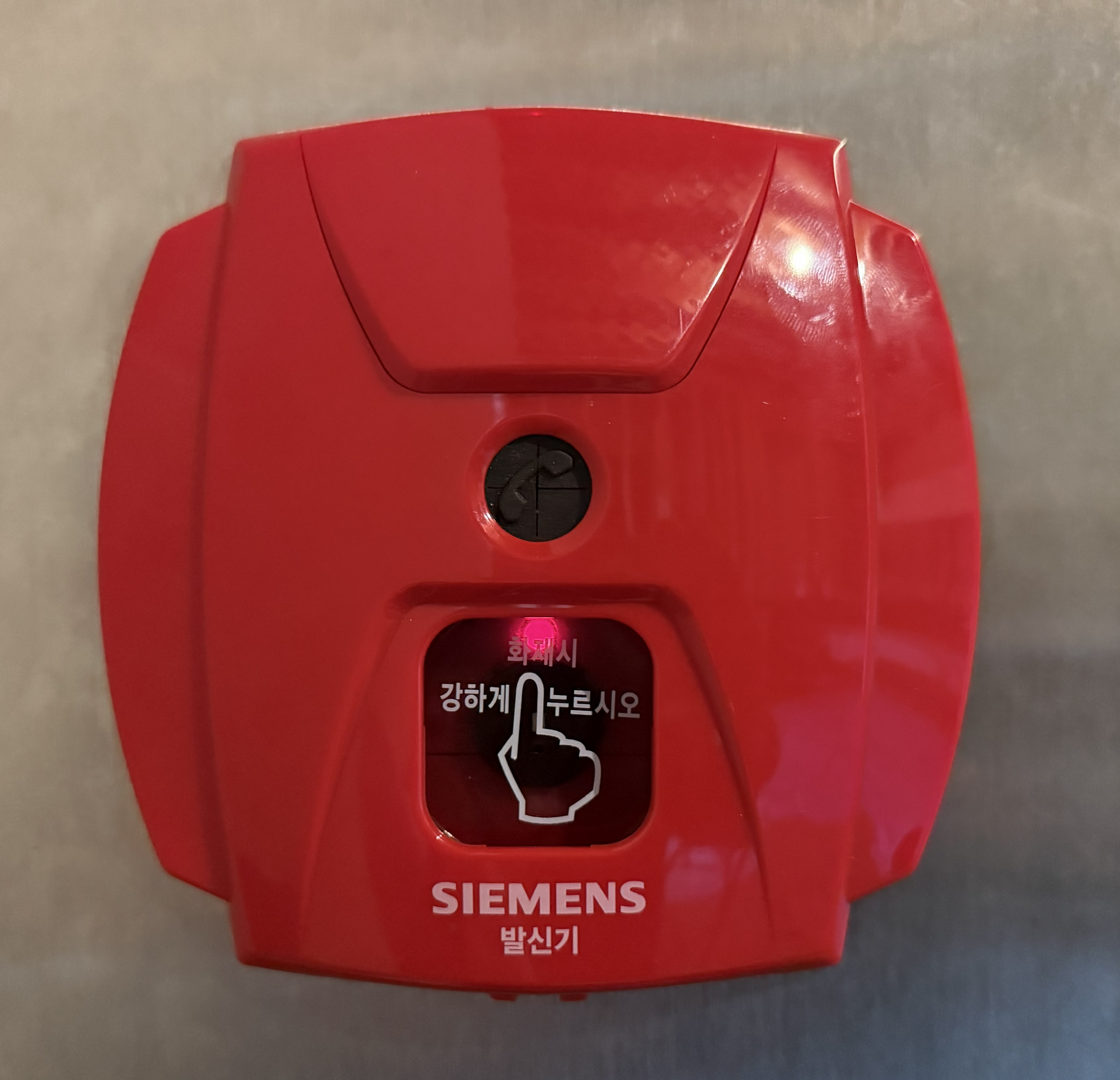
An activated Siemens MCL-R1A call point with telephone jack and illuminated response LED

Initiating devices used to activate a fire alarm system are either manually or automatically actuated devices. Manually actuated devices, also known as fire alarm boxes, manual pull stations, or simply pull stations, break glass stations, and (in Europe) call points, are installed to be readily located (usually near the exits of a floor or building), identified, and operated. They are usually actuated using physical interaction, such as pulling a lever or breaking glass.

Automatically actuated devices can take many forms, and are intended to respond to any number of detectable physical changes associated with fire: convected thermal energy for a heat detector, products of combustion for a smoke detector, radiant energy for a flame detector, combustion gases for a fire gas detector, and operation of sprinklers for a water-flow detector. Automatic initiating devices may use cameras and computer algorithms to analyze and respond to the visible effects of fire and movement in applications inappropriate for or hostile to other detection methods.

== Notification appliances ==
The standard fire alarm sound used in most of North America

A Honeywell SC809A1019 speaker with a Space Age V33 light

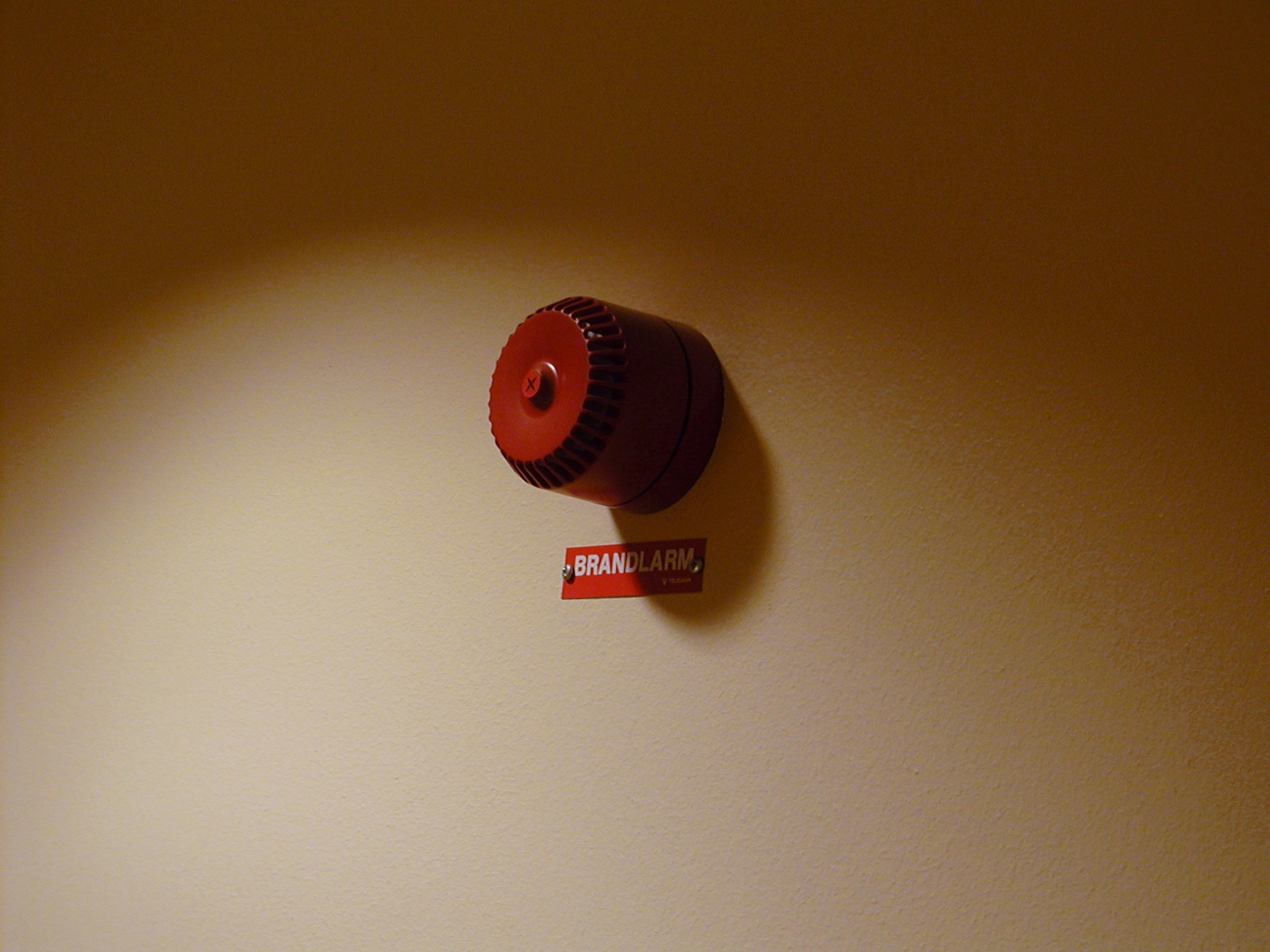
A fire alarm notification appliance in Sweden

Alarms can take many forms, but are most often either motorized bells or wall-mountable sounders or horns. They can also be speaker strobes that sound an alarm, followed by a voice evacuation message for clearer instructions on what to do. Fire alarm sounders can be set to certain frequencies and different tones, either low, medium, or high, depending on the country and manufacturer of the device. Most fire alarm systems in Europe sound like a siren with alternating frequencies. Fire alarm electronic devices are known as horns in the United States and Canada and can be continuous or set to different codes. Fire alarm warning devices can also be set to different volume levels.

Notification appliances utilize audible, visible, tactile, textual or even olfactory stimuli (odorizers) to alert the occupants of the need to evacuate or take action in the event of a fire or other emergency. Evacuation signals may consist of simple appliances that transmit uncoded information, coded appliances that transmit a predetermined pattern, and/or appliances that transmit audible and visible information such as live or prerecorded instructions and illuminated message displays. Some notification appliances are a combination of fire alarm and general emergency notification appliances, allowing both types of emergency notifications from a single device. In addition to pre-recorded and predetermined messages and instructions, some systems also support the live broadcasting and recording of voice announcements to all or certain parts of the property or facility, including customized instructions for the situation for each area, such as by emergency or facility management personnel. Outdoor appliances (such as large-scale speaker/horn/strobe poles to effectively reach outdoor occupants over potentially larger distances or areas), lighting control, and dynamic exit signage may also be used in certain circumstances.

=== Emergency voice alarm communication systems ===
Some fire alarm systems utilize emergency voice alarm communication systems (EVAC) to provide prerecorded and manual voice messages. Voice alarm systems are typically used in high-rise buildings, arenas, and other large "defend-in-place" occupancies such as hospitals and detention facilities where total evacuation is difficult to achieve. Voice-based systems allow response personnel to conduct orderly evacuation and notify building occupants of changing event circumstances.

Audible textual appliances can be employed as part of a fire alarm system that includes EVAC capabilities. High-reliability speakers notify the occupants of the need for action concerning a fire or other emergency. These speakers are employed in large facilities where general undirected evacuation is impracticable or undesirable. The signals from the speakers are used to direct the occupant's response. The fire alarm system automatically actuates speakers in a fire event. Following a pre-alert tone, selected groups of speakers may transmit one or more prerecorded messages directing the occupants to safety. These messages may be repeated in one or more languages. The system may be controlled from one or more locations within the building, known as "fire warden stations", or from a single location designated as the building's "fire command center". From these control locations, trained personnel activating and speaking into a dedicated microphone can suppress the replay of automated messages to initiate or relay real-time voice instructions.

In highrise buildings, different evacuation messages may be played on each floor, depending on the location of the fire. The floor the fire is on along with ones above it may be told to evacuate while floors much lower may be asked to stand by.

=== In the United States ===
In the United States, fire alarm evacuation signals generally consist of a standardized audible tone, with visual notification in all public and common-use areas. Emergency signals are intended to be distinct and understandable to avoid confusion with other signals.

As per NFPA 72, 18.4.2 (2010 Edition), Temporal Code 3 is the standard audible notification in a modern system. It consists of a repeated three-pulse cycle (0.5 s on, 0.5 s off, 0.5 s on, 0.5 s off, 0.5 s on, 1.5 s off). Voice evacuation is the second most common audible notification in modern systems. Legacy systems, typically found in older schools and buildings, have used continuous tones alongside other audible notifications.

=== In the United Kingdom ===
In the United Kingdom, fire alarm evacuation signals generally consist of a two-tone siren with visual notifications in all public and common-use areas. Some fire alarm devices can emit an alert signal, which is generally used in schools for lesson changes, the start of morning break, the end of morning break, the start of lunch break, the end of lunch break, and when the school day is over.

== Emergency communication systems ==
New codes and standards introduced around 2010, especially the new UL Standard 2572, the US Department of Defense's UFC 4-021-01 Design and O&M Mass Notification Systems, and NFPA 72 2010 edition Chapter 24, have led fire alarm system manufacturers to expand their systems voice evacuation capabilities to support new requirements for mass notification. These expanded capabilities include support for multiple types of emergency messaging (i.e., inclement weather emergency, security alerts, amber alerts). The major requirement of a mass notification system is to provide prioritized messaging according to the local facilities' emergency response plan, and the fire alarm system must support the promotion and demotion of notifications based on this emergency response plan. In the United States, emergency communication systems also have requirements for visible notification in coordination with any audible notification activities to meet the needs of the Americans with Disabilities Act.

Mass notification system categories include the following:

- Tier 1 systems are in-building and provide the highest level of survivability
- Tier 2 systems are out of the building and provide the middle level of survivability
- Tier 3 systems are "At Your Side" and provide the lowest level of survivability

Mass notification systems often extend the notification appliances of a standard fire alarm system to include PC-based workstations, computers, mobile devices, text-based or display monitor-based digital signage, and a variety of remote notification options including email, text message, RCS/other messaging protocols, phone calls, social media, RSS feed, or IVR-based telephone text-to-speech messaging. In some cases and locations, such as airports, localized cellular communication devices may also send wireless emergency alerts to cell phones in the area, and radio override may override other radio signals to play the emergency message and instructions to radios in range of the signal.

== Residential systems ==
Residential fire alarm systems are commonplace. Typically, residential fire alarm systems are installed along with security alarm systems. In the United States, the NFPA requires residential fire alarm system in buildings where more than 12 smoke detectors are needed. Residential systems generally have fewer parts compared to commercial systems.

== Building safety interfaces ==
Various equipment may be connected to a fire alarm system to facilitate evacuation or to control a fire, directly or indirectly:

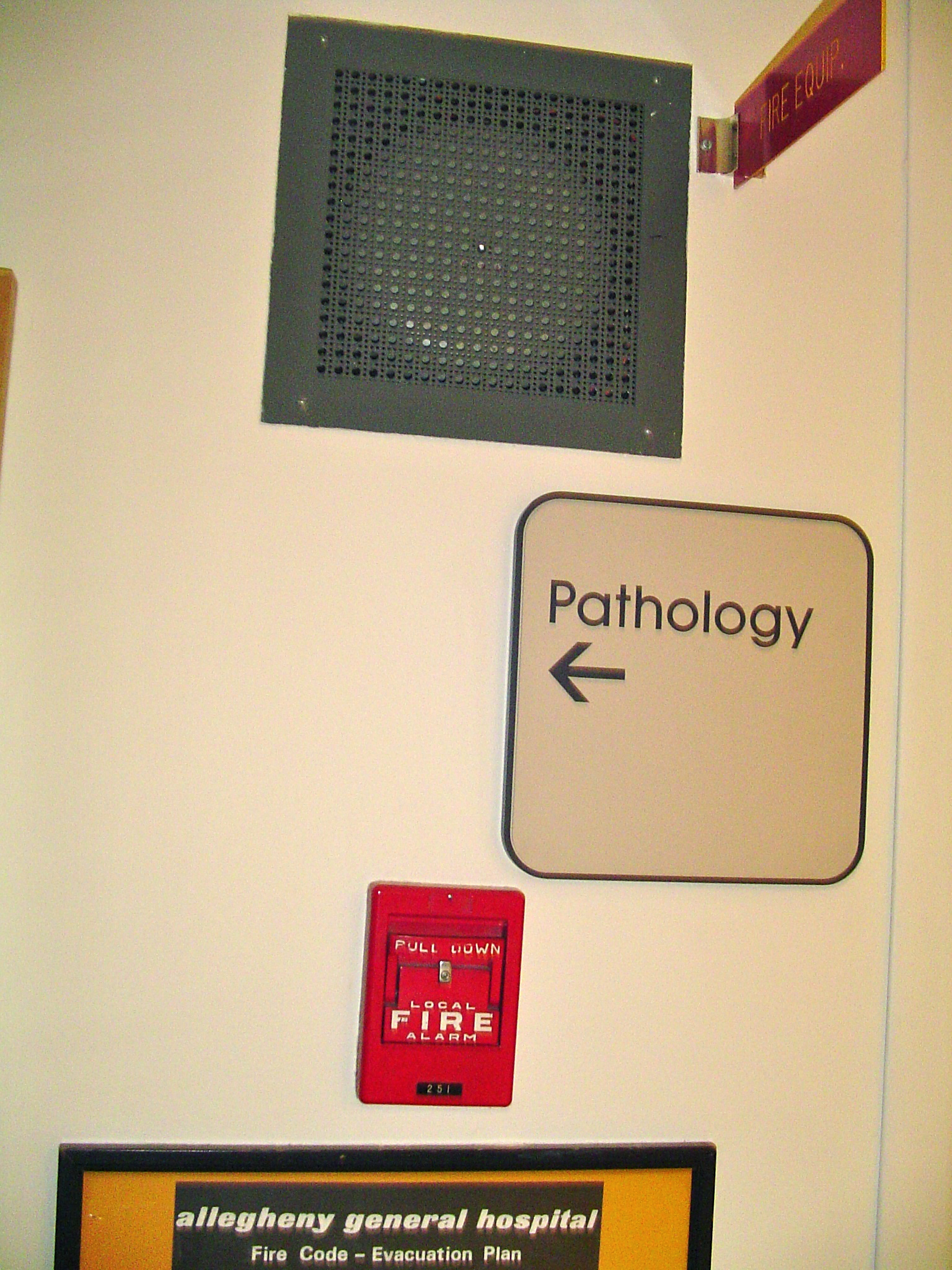
Coded fire alarm pull station below a 10-inch (25 cm) bell.

- Magnetic smoke door holders and retainers are wall-mounted solenoids or electromagnets controlled by a fire alarm system or detection component that magnetically secures spring-loaded self-closing smoke-tight doors in the open position. The device demagnetizes to allow automatic closure of the door on command from the fire control or upon failure of the power source, interconnection, or controlling element. Stored energy in the form of a spring or gravity can then close the door to restrict the passage of smoke from one space to another in order to facilitate evacuation and firefighting efforts. Electromagnetic fire door holders may also be hard-wired into the fire panel, radio-controlled, triggered by radio waves from a central controller connected to a fire panel, or acoustic, which learns the sound of the fire alarm and releases the door upon hearing this exact sound.
- Duct-mounted smoke detectors may be mounted in such a manner as to sample the airflow through ductwork and other plenums fabricated explicitly for the transport of environmental air into conditioned spaces. As part of the fire alarm system, these detectors may be connected to the fan motor control circuits in order to stop air movement, close dampers and generally prevent the recirculation of toxic smoke and fumes from fire in occupied spaces.
- Automatic initiating devices associated with elevator operation are used for emergency elevator functions, such as the recall of associated elevator cab(s). The recall will cause the elevator cabs to return to the ground level for use by fire service response teams and to ensure that cabs do not return to the floor of fire incidence, as well as preventing people from becoming trapped in the elevators. Phases of operation include primary recall (typically the ground level), alternate/secondary recall (typically a floor adjacent to the ground level—used when the fire alarm initiation occurred on the primary level), illumination of the "fire hat" indicator when an alarm occurs in the elevator hoistway or associated control room, and in some cases shunt trip (disconnect) of elevator power (generally used where the control room or hoistway is protected by fire sprinklers).
- Audio public address racks can be interfaced with a fire alarm system by adding a signaling control relay module to either the rack's power supply unit or the main amplifier driving the rack. The purpose of the fire alarm system interface is usually to "mute" the background music in case of an emergency.

== British fire alarm system categories ==
In the United Kingdom, fire alarm systems in non-domestic premises are generally designed and installed in accordance with the guidance given in BS 5839 Part 1. There are many types of fire alarm systems, each suited to different building types and applications. A fire alarm system can vary dramatically in price and complexity, from a single panel with a detector and sounder in a small commercial property to an addressable fire alarm system in a multi-occupancy building.

BS 5839 Part 1 categorizes fire alarm systems as:

- "M" manual systems (no automatic fire detectors, so the building is fitted with call points and sounders).
- "L" automatic systems intended for the protection of life.
- "P" automatic systems intended for the protection of property.

Categories for automatic systems are further subdivided into L1 to L5 and P1 to P2.

M	Manual systems, e.g., handbells, gongs, etc. These may be purely manual or manual electric, the latter may have call points and sounders. They rely on the occupants of the building discovering the fire and acting to warn others by operating the system. Such systems form the basic requirement for places of employment with no sleeping risk; e.g., a fire cannot occur while occupants are asleep.
P1	The system is installed throughout the building—the objective is to automatically call the fire brigade as early as possible to minimize any damage caused by the fire. Small low-risk areas can be excepted from the system, such as toilets and cupboards less than one square meter (11 sq ft).
P2	Detection should be provided in parts of the building where the risk of ignition is high and/or the contents are precious. Category 2 systems provide fire detection in specified parts of the building where there is either high risk or where business disruption must be minimized.
L1	A category L1 system is designed for the protection of life and which has automatic detectors installed throughout all areas of the building (including roof spaces and voids) to provide the earliest possible warning. A category L1 system is likely to be appropriate for the majority of residential care premises. In practice, detectors should be placed in nearly all spaces and voids. With category 1 systems, the whole of a building is covered apart from minor exceptions.
L2	A category L2 system is designed for the protection of life and has automatic detectors installed in escape routes, rooms adjoining escape routes and high-hazard rooms. In medium-sized premises (sleeping no more than ten residents), category L2 system are often used. These fire alarm systems are identical to an L3 system but with additional detection in areas with a high chance of ignition (e.g., kitchens) or where the risk to people is particularly increased (e.g., sleeping risk).
L3	This category is designed to give early warnings to everyone. Detectors should be placed in all escape routes and all rooms that open onto escape routes. Category 3 systems provide more extensive cover than Category 4. The objective is to warn the occupants of the building early enough to ensure that all can exit the building before escape routes become impassable.
L4	Category 4 systems cover escape routes and circulation areas only. Therefore, detectors will be placed in escape routes, although this may not be suitable depending on the risk assessment or if the size and complexity of a building are increased. Detectors might be located in other areas of the building, but the objective of an L4 system is to protect the escape route.
L5	This is the "all other situations" category, e.g., computer rooms, which may be protected with an extinguishing system triggered by automatic detection. Category 5 systems are the "custom" category and relate to special requirements that other categories cannot cover.

=== Zoning ===
An important consideration when designing fire alarms is that of individual "zones". The following recommendations are found in BS 5839 Part 1:

- A single zone should not exceed 2,000 square meters (22,000 sq ft) in floor space.
- Where addressable systems are in place, two faults should not remove protection from an area greater than 10,000 square meters (110,000 sq ft).
- A building may be viewed as a single zone if the floor space is less than 300 square meters (3,200 sq ft).
- Where the floor space exceeds 300 square meters (3,200 sq ft) then all zones should be restricted to a single floor level.
- Stairwells, lift shafts or other vertical shafts (nonstop risers) within a single fire compartment should be considered as one or more separate zones.
- The maximum distance traveled within a zone to locate the fire should not exceed 60 meters (200 ft).

The NFPA recommends placing a list for reference near the fire alarm control panel showing the devices contained in each zone.

== See also ==
- Fire Safety Evaluation System
- Multiple-alarm fire
- National Fire Protection Association
- Smoke detector
- Fire drill
- False alarm
- EN 54 – European Standard for Fire detection
- Emergency population warning - a way to warn people through audible and visual devices when people are in harm's way.
