= NFPA 72 =

Fire alarm installation standard

The NFPA 72 (National Fire Alarm and Signaling Code) is a standard published by the National Fire Protection Association every 3 years for installation of fire alarm systems and emergency communication systems in the United States.

== Purpose ==
The NFPA 72 "covers the application, installation, location, performance, inspection, testing, and maintenance of fire alarm systems, supervising station alarm systems, public emergency alarm reporting systems, fire warning equipment and emergency communications systems (ECS), and their components." Federal, state, and local municipalities across the United States have adopted the NFPA 72 as a standard in the enforcement of fire code regulation. Municipalities often adopt revisions of the code after years of review and amendments, making many local fire codes specific to their governing authorities.

== Structure ==
NFPA 72: National Fire Alarm and Signaling Code®, 2025 Edition (Current)

- About NFPA 72
- Origin and Development
- Committee Lists
- Chapter 1 Administration
- Chapter 2 Referenced Publications
- Chapter 3 Definitions
- Chapter 4 Reserved
- Chapter 5 Reserved
- Chapter 6 Reserved
- Chapter 7 Documentation
- Chapter 8 Reserved
- Chapter 9 Reserved
- Chapter 10 Fundamentals
- Chapter 11 Cybersecurity
- Chapter 12 Circuits and Pathways
- Chapter 13 Reserved
- Chapter 14 Inspection, Testing, and Maintenance
- Chapter 15 Reserved
- Chapter 16 Reserved
- Chapter 17 Initiating Devices
- Chapter 18 Notification Appliances
- Chapter 19 Reserved
- Chapter 20 Reserved
- Chapter 21 Emergency Control Function Interfaces
- Chapter 22 Reserved
- Chapter 23 Protected Premises Alarm and Signaling Systems
- Chapter 24 Emergency Communications Systems (ECSs)
- Chapter 25 Reserved
- Chapter 26 Supervising Station Alarm Systems
- Chapter 27 Public Emergency Alarm Reporting Systems
- Chapter 28 Reserved
- Chapter 29 Single- and Multiple-Station Alarms and Household Signaling Systems
- Annex A Explanatory Material
- Annex B Engineering Guide for Automatic Fire Detector Spacing
- Annex C System Performance and Design Guide
- Annex D Speech Intelligibility
- Annex E Sample Ordinance Adopting NFPA 72
- Annex F Wiring Diagrams and Guide for Testing Fire Alarm Circuits
- Annex G Guidelines for Emergency Communication Strategies for Buildings and Campuses
- Annex H Carbon Monoxide
- Annex I Color-Coded Tagging Program
- Annex J Informational References

The NFPA 72 2022 (Previous) is sectioned as follows:

- Chapter 1 Administration
- Chapter 2 Referenced Publications
- Chapter 3 Definitions
- Chapter 4 Reserved
- Chapter 5 Reserved
- Chapter 6 Reserved
- Chapter 7 Document
- Chapter 8 Reserved
- Chapter 9 Reserved
- Chapter 10 Fundamentals
- Chapter 11 Reserved
- Chapter 12 Circuits and Pathways
- Chapter 13 Reserved
- Chapter 14 Inspection, Testing, and Maintenance
- Chapter 15 Reserved
- Chapter 16 Reserved
- Chapter 17 Initiating Devices
- Chapter 18 Notification Appliances
- Chapter 19 Reserved
- Chapter 20 Reserved
- Chapter 21 Emergency Control Function Interfaces
- Chapter 22 Reserved
- Chapter 23 Protected Premises Alarm and Signaling Systems
- Chapter 24 Emergency Communications Systems (ECS)
- Chapter 25 Reserved
- Chapter 26 Supervising Station Alarm Systems
- Chapter 27 Public Emergency Alarm Reporting Systems
- Chapter 28 Reserved
- Chapter 29 Single- and Multiple-Station Alarms and Household Signaling Systems
- Annex A Explanatory Material
- Annex B Engineering Guide for Automatic Fire Detector Spacing
- Annex C System Performance and Design Guide
- Annex D Speech Intelligibility
- Annex E Sample Ordinance Adopting NFPA 72
- Annex F Wiring Diagrams and Guide for Testing Fire Alarm Circuits
- Annex G Guidelines for Emergency Communication Strategies for Buildings and Campuses
- Annex H Carbon Monoxide
- Annex I Informational References
- Index

A previous version of NFPA 72 (2016) was sectioned as follows:

- 1. Administration
- 2. References and Publications
- 3. Definitions
- 4. Reserved
- 5. Reserved
- 6. Reserved
- 7. Documentation
- 8. Reserved
- 9. Reserved
- 10. Fundamentals
- 11. Reserved
- 12. Circuits and Pathways
- 13. Reserved
- 14. Inspection, Testing, and Maintenance
- 15. Reserved
- 16. Reserved
- 17. Initiating Devices
- 18. Notification Appliances
- 19. Reserved
- 20. Reserved
- 21. Emergency Control Interfaces
- 22. Reserved
- 23. Protected Premises Fire Alarm Systems
- 24. Emergency Communications Systems (ECS)
- 25. Reserved
- 26. Supervision Station Alarm Systems
- 27. Public Emergency Alarm Reporting Systems
- 28. Reserved
- 29. Single and Multiple-Station Alarms and Household Fire Alarm Systems
- Annex A
- Annex B
- Annex C
- Annex D
- Annex E
- Annex F
- Annex G Informational References
- Index
