= EN 54 =

European Standard

EN 54-x
- EN standard
- Reference: EN 54-x
- Status: Published
- Title: Fire detection and fire alarm systems
- Committee: CEN/TC 72
- Work Item: various
- Directives: 305/2011, 89/106/EEC
- Citation in OJEU: 305/2011 (C 226, 2015-07-10)
- CE marking: Yes

The EN 54 Fire detection and fire alarm systems is a series of European standards that includes product standards and application guidelines for fire detection and fire alarm systems as well as voice alarm systems.

The product standards define product characteristics, test methods and performance criteria against which the effectiveness and reliability of every component of fire detection and fire alarm system can be assessed and declared.

Many of the product standards of the EN 54 series are harmonised standards under the Construction Products Regulation (CPR) EU 305/2011. Annex ZA of the harmonised standards specifies which sections of the standard apply for the purposes of the CPR. Annex ZA also describes the two-stage certification:

- certification of constancy of performance for the product (product certification) and
- certification of conformity of factory production control (FPC certification)

This standard series is partly used around the world in several countries outside of European Union, for example in Latin American countries, Brasil, African and Asian countries and several islands in the Pacific Ocean.

== History ==
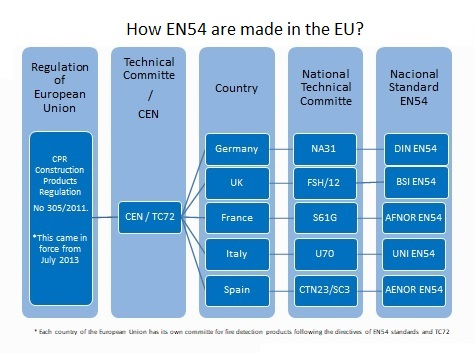
How EN54 are made in the EU

The standardization topics relating to fire protection were among the first dealt with by CEN. This is obvious since CEN numbers the European standards in numerical ascending order according to the date of project registration. The standard on fire classes is numbered EN 2 and the series of standards on portable fire extinguishers is numbered EN 3. The European standardization on fire detection and fire alarm systems started already in the 1970s. EN 54-1 and EN 54-5 were issued in 1976.

== Technical Committee CEN/TC72 Fire detection and fire alarm systems ==
The EN 54 series has been prepared by Technical Committee CEN/TC72 "Fire detection and fire alarm systems" of the European Committee for Standardization (CEN, French: Comité Européen de Normalisation). The figure shows some examples of national mirror technical committees.

== EN 54 Standard Series ==
=== Current parts ===
The EN 54 series of standards covers the following topics and product groups related to fire detection and fire alarm systems:

- Introduction: the introduction to the series of standards contains a diagram of a fire alarm system as well as numerous definitions of terms that are used in the other parts of the series of standards.
- Product group control panels and power supply: These parts of EN 54 concern fire alarm control panels, voice alarm control panels and power supplies.
- Product group alarm devices: These parts of EN 54 concern optical and acoustic alarm devices (flashing lights, sounders, loudspeakers).
- Product group detectors: These parts of EN 54 concern manual call points and automatic fire detectors according to different measuring principles (smoke detectors, heat detectors, fire gas detectors ...).
- Product group "other components": These parts of EN 54 concern other devices that can be connected in a fire detection system, either as a stand-alone device or integrated in another component.
- System compatibility: This part of EN 54 deals with the compatibility of the system components of a fire detection and fire alarm system.
- Application guidelines: These parts of EN 54 are guidelines for the application of fire alarm systems and voice alarm systems. They have the status of a technical specification (CEN/TS).

The following table lists all parts of the EN 54 series of standards:

Parts of the EN 54 series on fire detection and fire alarm systems
Topics, group of products	Number of the standard	Title of the standard	Stand	Harmonized
Introduction	EN 54-1	Part 1: Introduction	2021	No
Control panels and power supply	EN 54-2	Part 2: Control and indicating equipment (Fire alarm control panel)	1997 + A1:2006 + AC:1999	Yes
Alarm devices	EN 54-3	Part 3: Fire alarm devices - Sounders	2014 + A1:2019	Yes
Control panels and power supply	EN 54-4	Part 4: Power supply equipment	1997 + A1:2002 + A2:2006 + AC:1999	Yes
Detectors	EN 54-5	Part 5: Heat detectors - Point heat detectors	2017 + A1:2018	Yes
Detectors	EN 54-7	Part 7: Smoke detectors - Point smoke detectors using scattered light, transmitted light or ionization	2018	Yes
Detectors	EN 54-10	Part 10: Flame detectors - Point detectors	2002 + A1:2005	Yes
Detectors	EN 54-11	Part 11: Manual call point	2001 + A1:2005	Yes
Detectors	EN 54-12	Part 12: Smoke detectors - Line detectors using an optical light beam	2015	Yes
System compatibility	EN 54-13	Part 13: Compatibility and connectability assessment of system components	2017 + A1:2019	No
Application guidelines	CEN/TS 54-14	Part 14: Guidelines for planning, design, installation, commissioning, use and maintenance (of fire detection and fire alarm systems)	2018-10	No
Control panels and power supply	EN 54-16	Part 16: Voice alarm control and indicating equipment	2008	Yes
Other devices	EN 54-17	Part 17: Short circuit isolators	2005 + AC:2007	Yes
Other devices	EN 54-18	Part 18: Input/output devices	2005 + AC:2007	Yes
Detectors	EN 54-20	Part 20: Aspirating smoke detectors	2006 + AC:2008	Yes
Other devices	EN 54-21	Part 21: Alarm transmission and fault warning routing equipment	2006	Yes
Detectors	EN 54-22	Part 22: Resettable line type heat detectors	2015 + A1:2020	No
Alarm devices	EN 54-23	Part 23: Fire alarm devices - Visual alarm devices	2010	Yes
Alarm devices	EN 54-24	Part 24: Component of voice alarm systems - Loudspeakers	2008	Yes
Other devices	EN 54-25	Part 25: Components using radio links	2008 + AC:2012	Yes
Detectors	EN 54-26	Part 26: Point fire detectors using carbon monoxide sensors	2015	No
Detectors	EN 54-27	Part 27: Duct smoke detectors	2015	No
Detectors	EN 54-28	Part 28: Non-resettable line-type heat detectors	2016	No
Detectors	EN 54-29	Part 29: Multi-sensor fire detectors - Point detectors using a combination of smoke and heat sensors	2015	No
Detectors	EN 54-30	Part 30: Multi-sensor fire detectors - Point detectors using a combination of carbon monoxide and heat sensors	2015	No
Detectors	EN 54-31	Part 31: Multi-sensor fire detectors - Point detectors using a combination of smoke, carbon monoxide and optionally heat sensors	2014 + A1:2016	No
Application guidelines	CEN/TS 54-32	Part 32: Guidelines for the planning, design, installation, commissioning, use and maintenance of voice alarm systems	2015-07	No

=== Withdrawn parts ===
- EN 54 part 6 Heat detectors; Rate-of-Rise point detectors without a static element
- EN 54 part 8 Components of automatic fire detection systems. Specification for high temperature heat detectors
- EN 54 part 9 Components of automatic fire detection systems. Methods of test of sensitivity to fire

== Test fires of EN 54 ==
The test fires TF1 to TF8 are used to test the fire sensitivity of the fire detectors according to the standard series EN 54.

The combustibles selected represent a spectrum of large and small combustion particles for both grey and black smoke. These include burning liquids, plastics and cellulosic (wood) materials, and glowing and smouldering fabrics.

Test fires TF1 to TF8 according to EN 54
	Fire type	Combustible	Heat development	Upward flow	Smoke development	Aerosol spectrum	Visible part
TF1	open cellulosic fire	wood	strong	strong	yes	mainly invisible	dark
TF2	Smoldering pyrolysis fire	wood	negligible	weak	yes	visible	bright
TF3	glowing (smoldering) fire	cotton	negligible	very weak	yes	mainly invisible	bright
TF4	open plastics fire	polyurethane	strong	strong	yes	mainly invisible	very dark
TF5	liquid fire	n-heptane	strong	strong	yes	mainly invisible	very dark
TF6	liquid fire	methylated spirit	strong	strong	no	none	none
TF8	liquid fire	decalene	negligible	weak	yes	mainly invisible	very dark

For smoke detectors according to EN 54-7 and fire detectors with smoke sensor (parts 12, 20 and 30 of EN 54) the test fires TF2, TF3, TF4 and TF5 are used. The EN 54-20 defines the following test fires with reduced fuel quantity for aspirating smoke detectors with enhanced or very high sensitivity (class A or B):

- TF2A and TF2B
- TF3A and TF3B
- TF5A and TF5B

For flame detectors according to EN 54-10, the liquid fires TF5 and TF6 are used. TF5 (n-heptane) produces a yellow sooty flame and TF6 (methylated spirits) produces a clear invisible flame.

For CO fire detectors according to EN 54-26, the smoldering fires TF2 and TF3 are used.

For duct smoke detectors according to EN 54-27 the test fires TF2, TF4 and TF8 are used.

For multi-sensor fire detectors according to EN 54-29 and EN 54-31, the test fires TF1, TF2, TF3, TF4, TF5 and TF8 are used.

== See also ==
- CE marking
- European Committee for Standardization (CEN, French: Comité Européen de Normalisation)
- Technical Committees at the CEN website: http://www.cen.eu/cen/Sectors/Sectors/Construction/Pages/Workprogramme.aspx
