= Control4 =

American technology company

- Type: Public
- Traded as: Nasdaq: REZI
- Industry: Home automation
- Founded: 2003; 23 years ago
- Founders: Eric Smith; Will West; Mark Morgan
- Headquarters: Lehi, Utah
- Brands: Card Access; Extra Vegetables; Leaf; Pakedge; Triad; Ihiji; Neeo
- Services: Video Distribution; Audio Distribution; Smart Lighting; Climate Control; Video Intercom; Security Systems
- Number of employees: 400-500 (before merger with SnapAV)
- Parent: ADI Global Distribution
- Website: www.control4.com

Control4 is a brand of automation and networking systems for homes and businesses, offering a customisable and unified smart home system to automate and control connected devices including lighting, audio, video, climate control, intercom, and security. The Control4 platform interoperates with more than 13,000 third-party products and it is available in over 100 countries. After merging with SnapAV, by 2024 Control4 managed over half a million homes through a network of 12,000 authorised dealers. The company was based in Draper, Utah from 2003, until its relocation to Lehi, Utah in 2023. Control4 currently operates as a brand/division of ADI Global Distribution.

== History ==
Founded in 2003 by Eric Smith, Will West, and Mark Morgan, Control4 debuted at the 2004 CEDIA Expo home technology trade show and introduced its first products later that year, as an early entrant in the home automation market. Smith and West had previously created PHAST, an early home control system that was acquired by AMX in 1997; and STSN, a provider of Internet service for the hospitality industry. Control4 received funding from Foundation Capital, Thomas Weisel Venture Partners, Signal Peak Ventures, Frazier Technology Ventures, and Cisco Systems prior to its IPO on August 2, 2013.

On April 29, 2005, Control4 began shipping its first home automation products, which operated on both wireless and wired protocols. The company was the first to ship wireless products based on the 802.15.4 standard known as Zigbee. The first products shipped included the Control4 Media Controller, Wireless Dimmers, Wireless Switches, Touch Screens, Wireless Contact/Relay Extender, 16 Zone Audio Matrix Switch, and a Remote Control.

Martin Plaehn joined Control4 in September 2011, replacing long-serving Will West as CEO. West remained with the company as Chief Strategy Officer. Control4 became a publicly traded company (on the NASDAQ stock exchange under the stock symbol CTRL) from 2013 until 2019, when it was acquired by and merged with SnapAV.

On May 23, 2019, Control4 released its Smart Home OS3 platform, replacing its long-serving OS2 software. This included a dramatic redesign of the customer UI experience, and modernized the appearance from the old circular arrangement of icons. The OS3 platform included the ability to customize icon placement and order on both touchscreens and mobile devices.

In August 2019, Control4 completed a merger with consumer technology designer and manufacturer SnapAV. John Heyman (from SnapAV) served as CEO, and the company was rebranded as "Snap One."

Talk of a merger between the 2 companies had been ongoing since 2017, but Plaehn had resisted Snap's overtures to purchase Control4, believing in the company's own strategic direction. After SnapAV was acquired by Hellman and Associates in 2017, this gave that company the capital for such a large purchase. Martin Phaehn remained on the board of directors as a consultant.

On May 10, 2023, Control4 announced the opening of a new joint-headquarters in Lehi, Utah. Jeff Dungan, Chief Operations Officer explained: "The new co-headquarters features an Innovation Center with an expanded number of state-of-the-art laboratories, test areas, and training facilities that enables the company to accelerate the development of hardware and software products and services that can be envisioned, designed, prototyped, tested, and delivered faster than ever before to delight our Partners and their customers." Control4 had previously been based out of Draper, Utah since 2005, using the same building for nearly 20 years.

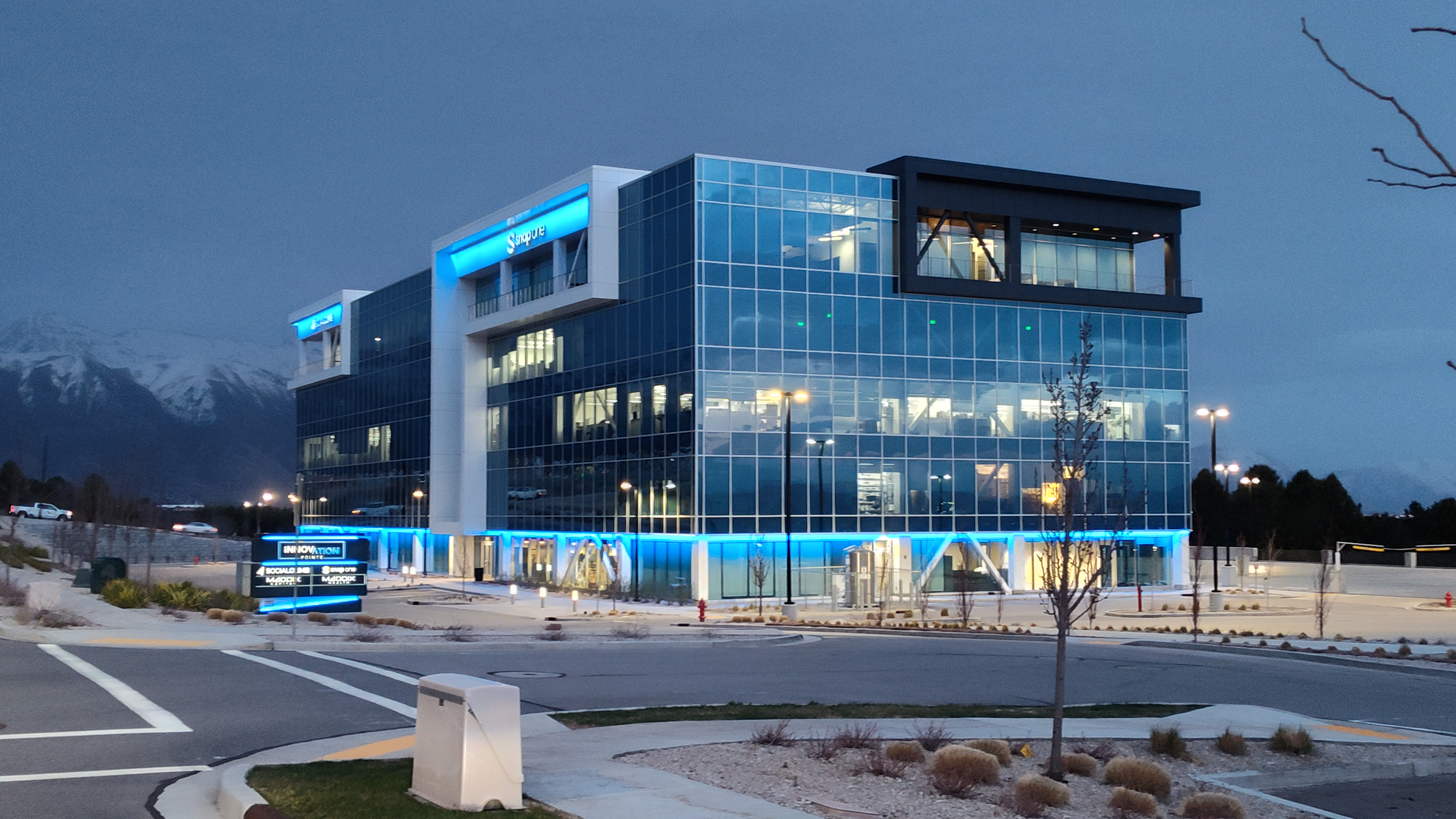
The new SnapOne Headquarters, located on the Timpanogos Highway in Lehi, Utah,

2023 proved a difficult year for the brand and Snap One. Due to company direction, economic factors brought on by the COVID-19 pandemic, and other headwinds, Control4's parent company Snap One announced layoffs in early 2023. A second round of layoffs followed in the fall of 2023. Sales dropped by 8.3% despite assurances from Snap's leadership that revenue would rebound in the second half of the year.

On June 14, 2024, the Control4 brand was acquired by Resideo Technologies. The brand was highly sought after to act as an automation solution for all the products sold by ADI. The Control4 brand will continue to offer smart home solutions through Resideo's ADI Global Distribution segment. John Heyman was replaced by Resideo CEO Jay Geldmacher.

On July 30, 2025, Resideo announced its intention to separate the ADI Global Distribution business through a tax free spin off to its shareholders. Control4 will remain under the ADI umbrella, resulting in a smaller company that has both 1P development platforms and a global distribution system. ADI will continue to be led by Rob Aarnes after the spin off in mid-2026.

== Products and services ==
Control4's home automation systems have been likened to an operating system for the home. The company offers products to manage climate control, home network, home security, intercom, multi-room audio, and smart lighting, offering a universal remote and voice control. It offers items such as a smart doorbell, smart outlets, security cameras, thermostats, centralized lighting panels, motion sensors, and KNX devices. The systems can be controlled from the Control4 smartphone app, keypads fitted to the walls, a traditional remote, or a portable touch screen.

In addition to its own products and services, Control4 supports more than 13,500 third-party products, including Amazon Alexa-enabled speaker devices, the Google Nest smart home thermostat, streaming services like Spotify and Netflix, Sonos music system, Apple TV, and products from Sony, Sub-Zero, Roku, LG, Samsung, Bose, Denon, Honeywell, Yale, and Lutron. With Control4, a homeowner could control "the ventilation in the garage, the music streaming to speakers in multiple rooms of his home, every light, the TV, the thermostat, even the Blu-Ray player in the guest house" from an iOS or Android device.

Installation of the Control4 system is done through a network of dealers who install the hardware and configure and customize the software to unify the homeowner's technology. A Control4 controller acts as the "brain" of the home, connecting to the home network and allowing the electronic devices and systems in the home to work together. There are various controllers available, including the CA-1, which offers Zigbee, Z-Wave, and Wi-Fi connectivity, and the EA-series controllers, which include streaming audio and HDMI out. The controllers come with touch screen panels or keypads, with versions available on both iOS and Android, and with Amazon Alexa compatibility.

In 2012, Control4 released its Simple Device Discovery Protocol (SDDP), which makes products embedded with the code automatically discoverable on a Control4 network. The company licenses the protocol to other vendors for their products, with more than 7,500 SDDP-embedded products as of June 2019.

In May 2019, Control4 debuted a new version of its operating system, Smart Home OS 3. The upgrade is designed to let users more easily customize and make changes to their Control4 Smart Home systems. With the upgrade, Control4 added streaming of MQA files, making it the first home automation company to support the high-resolution audio format.

In June 2019, streaming and download service Qobuz partnered with Control4 to bring hi-res music streaming to home automation installations, allowing Control4 users to upgrade to hi-res sound.

As of June 2021, Control4 was selling its products through nearly 6,000 authorized Control4 dealers, in addition to partnering with home builders including Toll Brothers and Arthur Rutenberg Homes.

== Acquisitions ==
Control4 made several acquisitions since going public in 2013, adding to its lineup of products and services.

- On July 1, 2014, Control4 acquired Utah-based Card Access's home automation products and intellectual property. Card Access products primarily were designed to control and monitor such things as doors, windows, gates, blinds, temperature, and projector screens.
- In September 2014, Control4 acquired UK-based Extra Vegetables Ltd., a privately held company. Extra Vegetables was best known for developing integration modules and drivers for Control4 smart home systems.
- In 2015, the company acquired Australian-based Nexus Technologies Pty., or more commonly called "Leaf," a high-end manufacturer of audio/video distribution products.
- Control4 acquired cloud enabled network hardware manufacturer Pakedge Device and Software in 2016; its largest acquisition to date.
- In 2017, Control4 acquired Triad, a high-end audio products company.
- On January 10, 2018, Control4 acquired Ihiji, a provider of remote monitoring services.
- In February 2019, Control4 acquired Neeo, a Switzerland-based company specializing in multi-device remote controls, for $11 million plus the assumption of $4.6 million in debt.

The Neeo purchase marked Control4's final acquisition before it was bought and merged with SnapAV in late summer, 2019.

== Future of Company ==
On April 15, 2024, it was announced that Resideo Technologies, a manufacturer and distributor of technology-driven products, would acquire Snap One for $10.75 per share in cash, for a transaction value of approximately $1.4 billion, inclusive of net debt. The acquisition was completed on June 14 of 2024. Resideo will integrate Snap One into its ADI Global Distribution. This will provide integrators with increased selection of 1P and 3P products through ADI branch stores and expand Control4's presence throughout the world. This business model is expected to continue after ADI Global Distribution spins off from Resideo in mid 2026.
