= Optical beam smoke detector =

Type of smoke detector

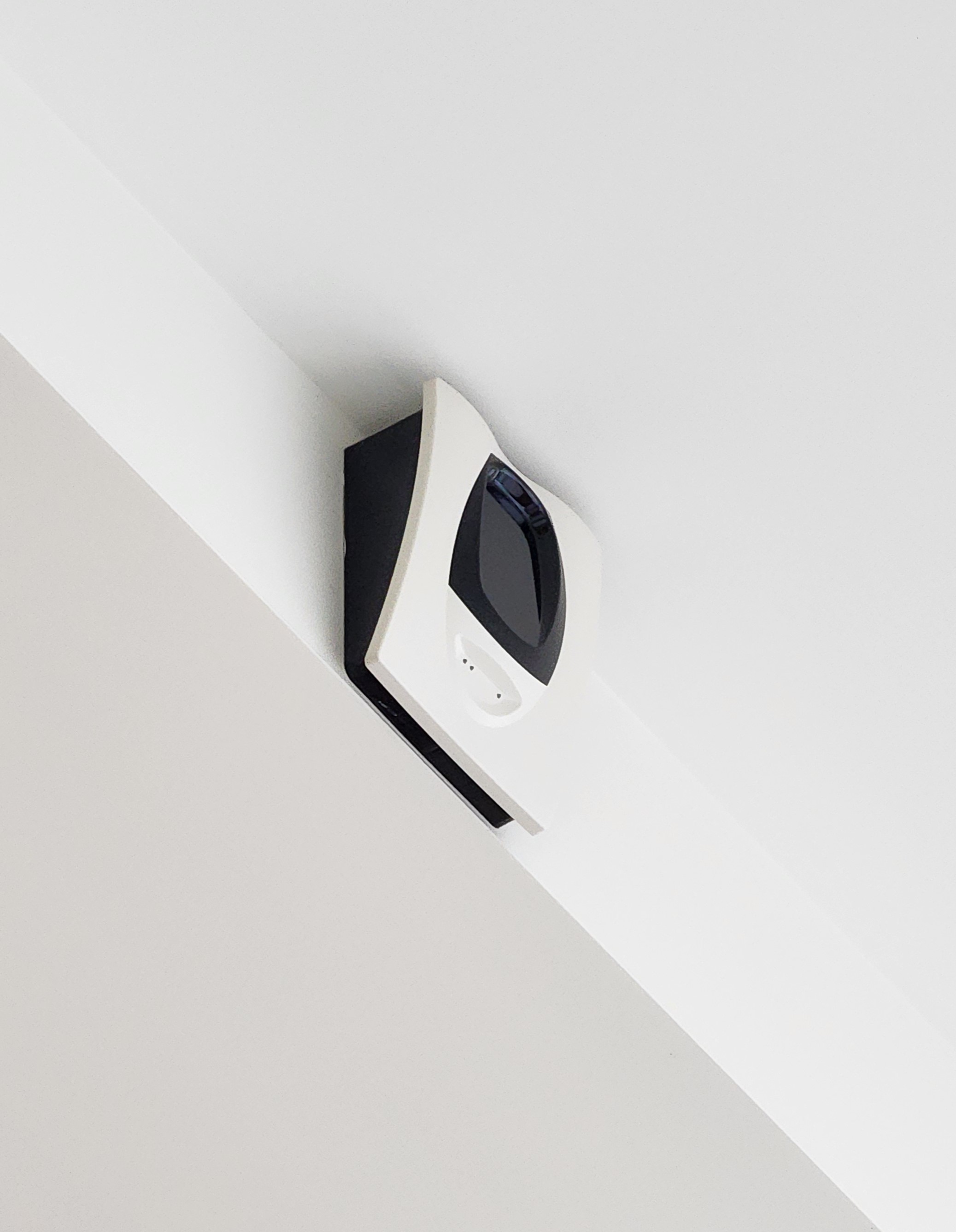
A typical optical beam smoke detector installed near the ceiling of a shopping mall.

An optical beam smoke detector is a device that uses a projected beam of light to detect smoke across large areas, typically as an indicator of fire. They are used to detect fires in buildings where standard point smoke detectors would either be uneconomical or restricted for use by the height of the building. Optical beam smoke detectors are often installed in warehouses as a cost-effective means of protecting large open spaces.

== Principle of operation ==
Optical beam smoke detectors work on the principle of light obscuration, where the presence of smoke blocks some of the light from the beam, typically through either absorbance or light scattering. Once a certain percentage of the transmitted light has been blocked by the smoke, a fire is signalled. Optical beam smoke detectors are typically used to detect fires in large commercial and industrial buildings, as components in a larger fire alarm system.

== Design ==
Optical beam smoke detectors consist of at least one light transmitter and one receiver, which is photosensitive. The photosensitive receiver monitors light produced by the transmitter under normal conditions. In the absence of smoke, light passes from the light transmitter to the receiver in a straight line. In a fire, when smoke falls within the path of the beam detector, some of the light is absorbed or scattered by the smoke particles. This creates a decrease in the received signal, leading to an increase in optical obscuration i.e. transmittance of light across the beam path.

=== End-to-end ===
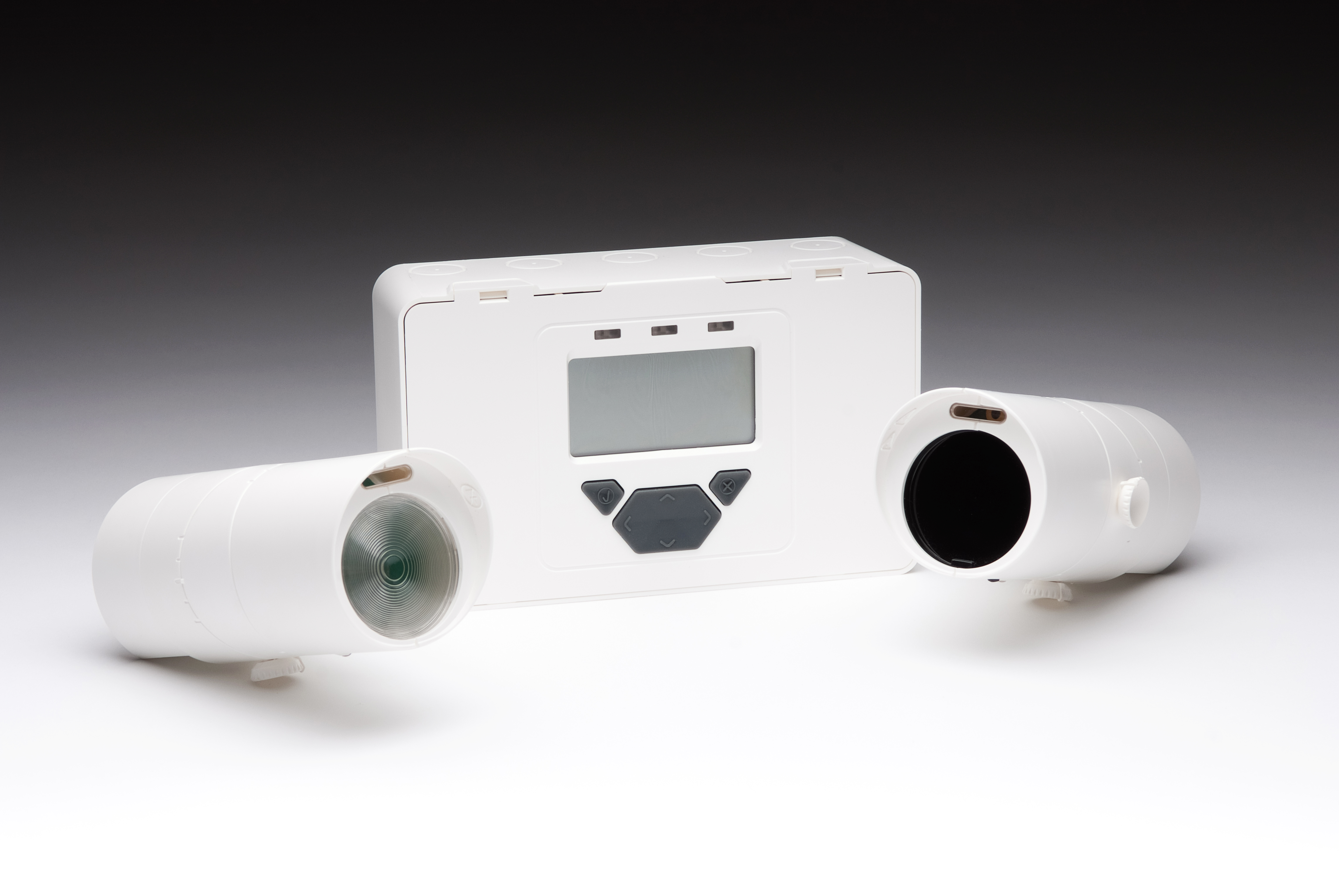

An end-to-end optical beam smoke detector is a system that has a separate light transmitter and receiver. They are used in applications where there is little available room to install a wide area detector – as the receiver is on a separate element each individual unit is quite small. The small size of the detector is also an advantage for aesthetic installations, where fire protection is required without introducing unsightly or overtly modern devices. Aesthetic considerations are especially important for cultural and heritage sites. End-to-end detectors include open-area smoke imaging detection, in which two wavelengths of light are used to detect smoke. UV and IR wavelengths of light react to smoke differently, and the comparative difference helps to verify real smoke by comparing the reflections and seeing a difference in the profile. UV and IR respond identically to things like blockage (ladder in front to detector path), bugs (blocking beam), fog, steam, and other things that commonly cause false alarms, so the two wavelengths of light are used together to detect smoke accurately.

=== Reflective ===
A reflective optical beam smoke detector incorporates a light transmitter and the detector on the same unit. The light path is created by reflecting light emitted from the transmitter off a retroreflector that is placed opposite the detector.

=== Motorised ===
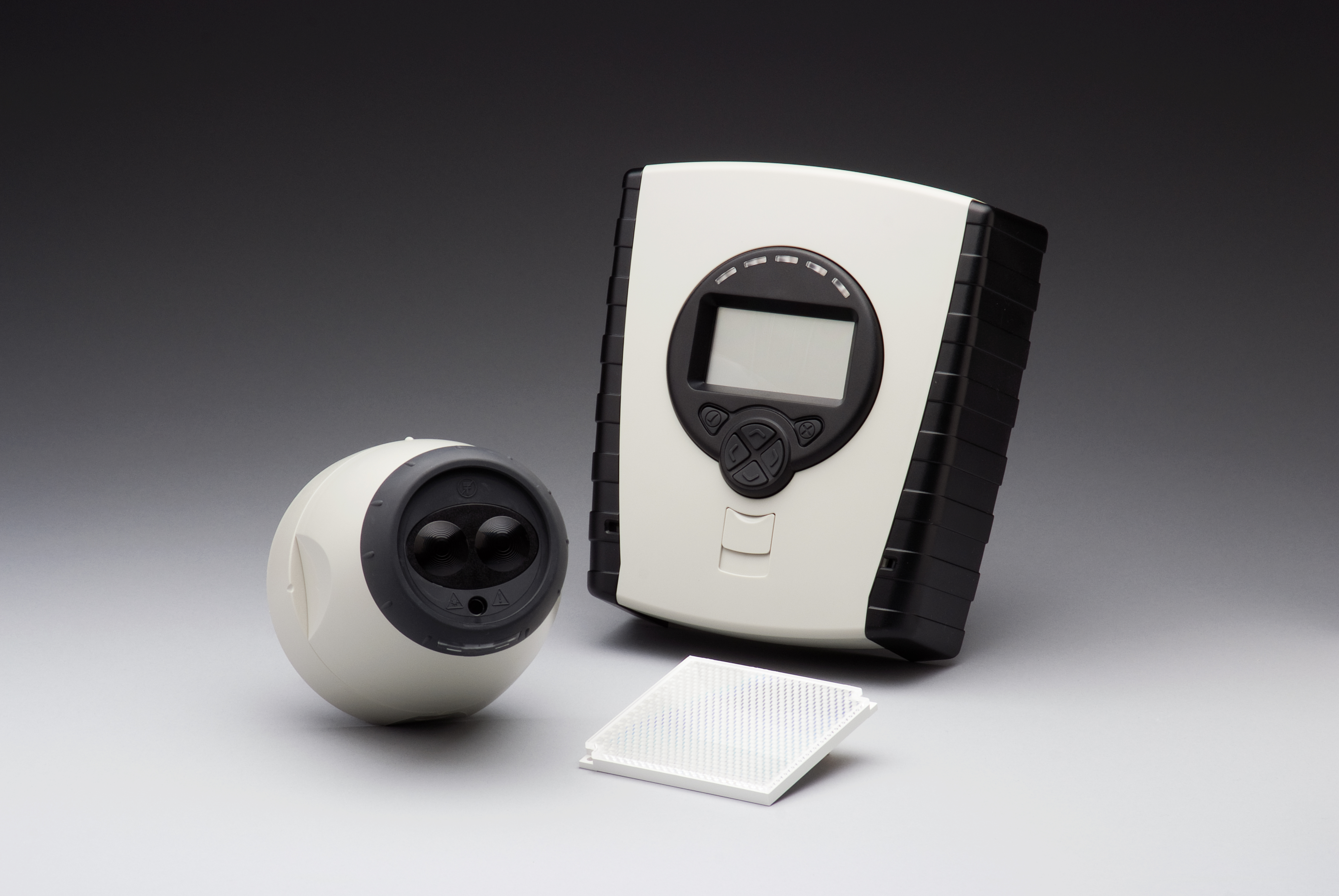

A motorised optical beam smoke detector automatically aligns itself during installation and can compensate for alignment 'drift' i.e. where the optical path of the light beam changes over time Both end-to-end systems and reflective systems can be motorised.

== Limitations ==
Early examples of optical beam smoke detectors were prone to false alarms, which were caused by many different factors. Most commonly, the build-up of dust, dirt and other debris would lower the detection threshold for the detector, causing the system to enter alarm when no fire was present. Modern devices use automatic gain control as a means of adapting the signal for these effects. Building movement is another common problem, where movement of the building causes the optical beam smoke detector to lose alignment. Motorised beam detectors have partially addressed this issue, but it can still be problematic in certain installations.

== See also ==
- Aspirating smoke detector
- Automatic fire suppression
- Carbon monoxide detector
- Fire alarm
- Fire sprinkler
- Flame detector
- Gaseous fire suppression
- Manual call point
- Passive infrared sensor
- Smoke detector
