= Fire detection =

Fire detectors sense one or more of the products or phenomena resulting from fire, such as smoke, heat, infrared and/or ultraviolet light radiation, or gas.

In dwellings, smoke detectors are often stand-alone devices. In non-domestic buildings, fire detection will typically take the form of a fire alarm system, incorporating one or more of the following automatic devices:

- Heat detector
- Smoke detector
- Flame detector
- Fire gas detector
