= Xtralis =

Fire safety and physical security equipment manufacturer

Xtralis Pty Ltd.
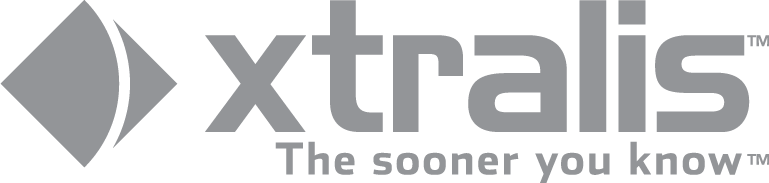
- Company type: Proprietary Limited Company
- Industry: Life Safety & Physical Security Equipment
- Founded: 1983
- Headquarters: Dublin, Ireland
- Products: Fire & Gas Detection Solutions, Perimeter and Intrusion Detection Solutions
- Number of employees: 500+
- Website: www.xtralis.com

Xtralis, now part of Honeywell, was a privately held firm. It manufactures smoke detection, gas detection and video surveillance security products for the early detection, visual verification, and prevention of fire and intrusion threats. Their most famous product is the VESDA brand of aspirating smoke detector.

== Company history ==
Xtralis Pty Ltd. was founded in 1982 and incorporated in 1983 under the name Vision Fire & Security Pty Ltd. Its headquarters are located in Dublin, Ireland. Xtralis acquired two companies: ASIM Technologies Ltd (in 2007) and VSK Group (also in 2007). In 2011 Xtralis then acquired the company HeiTel Digital Video GmbH. Today the company operates in over 100 countries and employs more than 400 people. The headquarters for the Fire and Environmental division of the company is in Melbourne and the headquarters for the Security Applications division is in Brussels.

On February 4, 2016, Honeywell entered into a definitive agreement to acquire Xtralis.

== Products ==
Xtralis manufactures VESDA and ICAM brand aspirating smoke detectors (ASD). They also produce ECO, an attachment module for VESDA & ICAM smoke detectors which detects gases by attaching to the ASD pipe network and sampling air that ASD is drawing to detector. The alarms are designed in order to work in a variety of environments, such as semiconductor clean rooms, data centers, warehouses, manufacturing facilities, and mining facilities—a range of both clean and very dirty or hazardous environments. In 2011 Xtralis began producing a non-ASD system, called OSID, that uses an optical detector to sense infrared and ultraviolet wavelengths and detect smoke. The system was awarded the North American Fire and Life Safety New Product Innovation Award by Frost & Sullivan. Xtralis smoke detection systems are used by one third of all Fortune 500 companies.

ADPRO is Xtralis' main line of security products, which features video & audio recording, transmission, and video content analytics; access control; intrusion detection systems; and Passive Infrared sensors (PIRs) designed for outdoor protection and the detection of individuals up to 150 feet away. ADPRO technology uses algorithms that screen out non-threatening factors in order to reduce the frequency of false alarms. Through its HeiTel group, Xtralis also sells digital video recording and transmission equipment for remote monitoring. Xtralis security systems are used by approximately 40% of Fortune 500 companies.

Xtralis smoke detectors and security systems have been installed in the European Parliament in Brussels, and corporate locations for Volkswagen and Renault. Other major institutions that utilize Xtralis systems are: NASA, the Dome of the Rock, the Clinton Presidential Center, Hearst Castle, Her Majesty's Prison Service, Heathrow airport, and the Eurostar railway system.
