= Resideo =

American industrial company

Resideo Technologies, Inc.
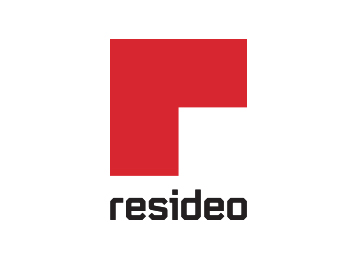
- Type: Public
- Traded as: NYSE: REZI; S&P 600 component
- ISIN: US76118Y1047
- Industry: Security systems, Home automation, Fire detection
- Founded: October 29, 2018
- Headquarters: Scottsdale, Arizona, U.S.
- Area served: Worldwide
- Key people: Jay Geldmacher (CEO); Tony Trunzo (CFO); Phillip Theodore (President P&S)
- Products: Home automation products
- Brands: Control4, Honeywell Home, First Alert
- Revenue: ▲US$7.47 billion (2025)
- Operating income: ▲US$607 million (2025)
- Net income: ▼US$−527 million (2025)
- Total assets: ▲US$8.43 billion (2025)
- Total equity: ▼US$2.92 billion (2025)
- Number of employees: 14,800 (2025)
- Divisions: ADI Global Distribution
- Website: www.resideo.com

Resideo Technologies, Inc. is an American multinational company that was formed in 2018 out of a spin-off from Honeywell. It provides room air temperature, quality, and humidity control and security systems primarily in residential dwellings in the U.S. and internationally. The company operates in two segments: products and distribution. It manufactures and distributes smart-home and software products, including temperature and lighting control, security, and water and air monitoring. The company also distributes security, fire and low-voltage products. The company has approximately 14,800 employees globally, and products in over 150 million households.

== History ==
=== Spin-off ===
Honeywell spun off the Homes and Distribution business in October 2018 as part of a corporate restructuring program. The new company was named Resideo. Shares in the company began trading on the New York Stock Exchange under the ticker symbol REZI. Roger Fradin, a former vice chairman of Honeywell, was named board chair. Mike Nefkens was named president and CEO. The company established its headquarters in Austin, Texas, following the spin-off. Resideo's shares initially traded at $28 with market capitalization of $3.2 billion. In its first full quarter as a standalone company, the company reported sales of $1.2 billion and earnings of $2.53 per share. In the second quarter of 2019, the company reported sales of $1.2 billion and earnings of $0.19 per share.

In 2021, Resideo announced that it would move its corporate headquarters from Austin, Texas, to Scottsdale, Arizona. The move was complete by early 2022.

=== Mergers and acquisitions ===
On March 28, 2019, Resideo announced the acquisition of Buoy Labs, a company that offers water usage and leak prevention products. All Buoy products have been discontinued and support was stopped 31st March 2021.

On May 21, 2019, Resideo announced it had acquired energy efficiency technology from Whisker Labs. The technology creates an thermodynamic model of a home to predict energy use and enable efficiency.

On June 27, 2019, Resideo announced the acquisition of LifeWhere, a company that uses predictive analytics to forecast home appliance failures.

On February 7, 2022, Resideo announced it would acquire First Alert from Newell Brands.

On April 15, 2024, Resideo announced it would acquire Snap One, a major home automation provider, for $10.75 per share in cash, for a transaction value of approximately $1.4 billion. This purchase includes the Control4 brand, which has provided home automation solutions since 2004. Other Snap One brands such as Triad, Luma, and Araknis will all be sold through ADI Global Distribution.

== Business units ==
=== Products ===
Resideo sells a range of products under the Honeywell Home brand through a long-term licensing agreement. Products include security cameras, heating and cooling controls (thermostats), water leak and freeze detectors.

=== Distribution ===
Resideo owns ADI Global Distribution, a wholesale distributor of security products. Along with the Homes unit, ADI Global was spun off from Honeywell as part of the restructuring that became Resideo.
