= Duane D. Pearsall =

American entrepreneur

Duane Darwin Pearsall
- Born: Duane D. Pearsall; March 3, 1922; Pontiac, Michigan
- Died: April 11, 2010 (aged 88); Denver, Colorado
- Education: General Motors Institute, University of Denver
- Spouse: Marjorie Fewel
- Children: 4
- Engineering career
- Institutions: Pearsall Company, Statitrol Corporation
- Projects: Commercial development of the first battery-powered ionization smoke detector.
- Awards: Small Business Person of the Year (Colorado), National Small Business Person of the Year, Fire Protection Man of the Year, Center for Fire Safety Studies Herrick Drake Commemorative Award

Duane Darwin "Dewey" Pearsall (March 3, 1922 – April 11, 2010) was an American entrepreneur best known for developing and marketing the first battery-powered home smoke detector in 1965.

== Biography ==
=== Early life ===
Pearsall was born in Pontiac, Michigan, on March 3, 1922. He attended high school in Keego Harbor, Michigan and attended the General Motors Institute (now Kettering University) from 1940 to 1942. He served in World War II from 1942 to 1945 in the Naval Air Corps, first as a navigator on a submarine patrol and later as a pilot. He married Marjorie Lee Fewel on July 22, 1944. After the war, he attended the University of Denver and graduated in 1947 with a Bachelor of Arts and Science. He then served in the Naval Air Reserve at Buckley Field from 1948 to 1954.

=== Business and engineering career ===
Pearsall worked with Honeywell Corporation as a heating and air conditioning sales engineer for seven years before founding the Pearsall Company in 1955. He founded Statitrol Corporation in Lakewood, Colorado, in 1963. A few months later, Lyman Blackwell, one of Pearsall's engineers at Statitrol, improvised a test to measure the flow of ions in an airstream discharging from a generator. When a technician, smoking nearby, casually exhaled smoke into the fan inlet of the generator, the ion meter pegged. Pearsall immediately realized that the basic ionization technology of this device could also be used for smoke detection. This accidental discovery was similar to a discovery made by Swiss physicist Walter Jaeger in the late 1930s. In 1965 Pearsall began the long process to develop and market a home smoke detector powered by a battery which could be easily installed and replaced. These first units were dubbed "SmokeGard 700"; Pearsall was awarded a design patent for this in 1973, and began mass-producing them in 1975. Shortly afterwards, he began working with the National Fire Protection Association (NFPA). His work with NFPA would eventually lead to the change of the uniform building codes to require smoke detectors in new construction. Statitrol sold the smoke detector invention to Emerson Electric in 1980.

Pearsall sold Statitrol in 1977. Later in life, he founded several companies and retired three separate times. He was a spokesman and advocate for American small business, which he considered to be the "backbone of the nation's economy". He traveled to Washington, D.C. numerous times to testify before Congressional committees on small business issues. Pearsall helped found the Small Business Council of the U.S. Chamber of Commerce in 1976, and was chairman of the Colorado Small Business Council in 1979. From 1975 to 1978, he served as a director of the Denver Chamber of Commerce, and from 1982 to 1989, he was a director of the Colorado Association of Commerce and Industry, serving as its chairman from 1985 to 1986. In 1983, Pearsall co-founded Columbine Venture Funds, an organization specializing in new technology located in Denver.

=== Later life ===
Pearsall and his wife Marge lived in Dillon, Colorado, from 2000 to 2007. They moved to Denver in 2007. Pearsall died on April 11, 2010, at his home in Denver.

== Awards and legacy ==
Pearsall won several awards and honors for his contributions to fire safety. In 1976, the Small Business Administration named Pearsall as Small Business Person of the Year for Colorado. In the same year, President Gerald Ford presented him with the National Small Business Person of the Year award. The Society of Fire Protection Engineers recognized him as Fire Protection Man of the Year in 1980. Pearsall was a charter member of the Worcester Polytechnic Institute (WPI) Fire Protection Engineering Board of Advisers and helped create the university's fire protection engineering program, now recognized as one of the leading fire safety study programs in the world. The university has honored him with an honorary doctorate and named him the first recipient of the Center for Fire Safety Studies Herrick Drake Commemorative Award in 1987. In 1996, WPI awarded him an honorary doctorate in science and in 2004 presented him with the WPI Presidential Medal.

The Rockies Venture Club, an organization that helps entrepreneurs obtain funding, established the Duane Pearsall Entrepreneurial Award, given at irregular intervals to noteworthy business owners in Colorado. Recipients have included John Elway, Roy Romer, Bill Daniels (posthumously), John Hickenlooper, and Rick Patch.

Pearsall's wrote his autobiography, My Life Unfolded, in 2009, but it was never published.
