= Aspirating smoke detector =

System in fire prevention

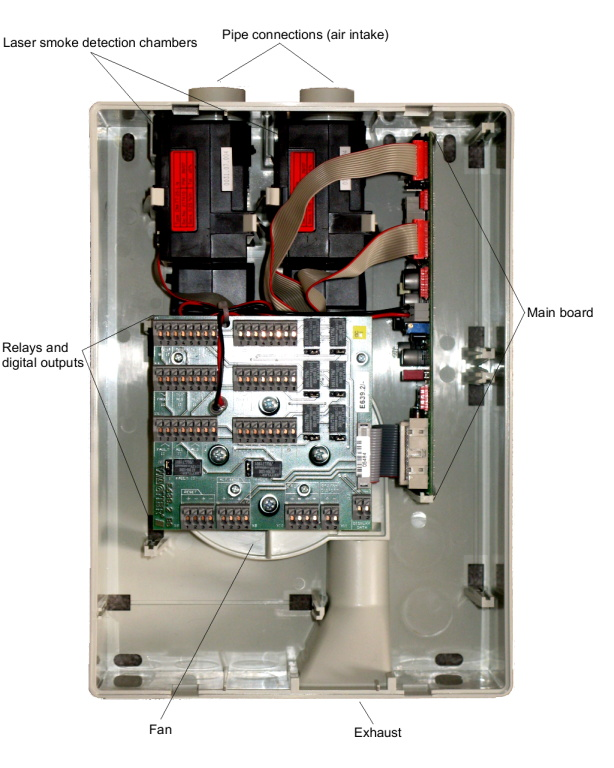
A TOP-SENS2 ASD unit made by Wagner (Germany)

An aspirating smoke detector (ASD) is a system used in active fire protection, consisting of a central detection unit which draws air through a network of pipes to detect smoke. The sampling chamber is based on a nephelometer that detects the presence of smoke particles suspended in air by detecting the light scattered by them in the chamber. ASDs can typically detect smoke before it is visible to the naked eye.

In most cases aspirating smoke detectors require a fan unit to draw in a sample of air from the protected area through its network of pipes.

== History ==
In 1970 the Australian Commonwealth Scientific and Industrial Research Organisation (CSIRO) used a nephelometer to carry out research into forest fires. Subsequently, the Australian Postmaster-General's Department engaged the CSIRO to investigate technologies that could prevent service interruption due to fire. After selecting a sample site to carry out research, the CSIRO suggested that the nephelometer should be used as the benchmark for the APO fire tests. This was installed to monitor smoke levels within the return-air ducts of the mechanical ventilation system, utilising a chart-recorder output display.

At the conclusion of several weeks of testing, it was discovered that there no commercially available fire detection technology suitable for preventing damage to telephone equipment. One technology that did show great promise however was the nephelometer itself.

In 1979, Xtralis, then IEI Pty Ltd., produced and sold an air sampling device they called VESDA (Very Early Smoke Detection Apparatus). The company redesigned the detector in 1982 to provide the reliability, features, size and reduced cost for export markets. ASD systems have gained popularity due to their ability to sense smoke long before a catastrophic incident.

== Design ==
ASD design corrects shortcomings of conventional smoke detectors by using a sampling pipe with multiple holes. The air samples are captured and filtered, removing any contaminants or dust to avoid false alarms and then processed by a centralized, highly sensitive laser detection unit. If smoke is detected, the systems alarm is triggered, and signals are then processed through centralized monitoring stations within a few seconds.

Unlike passive smoke detection systems, including spot detectors, ASD systems actively draw smoke to the detector through bore holes within a piping system that runs throughout the protected area. Furthermore, ASD systems incorporate integrity monitoring to ensure an alert is raised at any time the ASD's ability to detect smoke is compromised. This is not the case with passive devices that are generally only electrically monitored with no ability to determine if smoke can actually reach the detection element.

ASD systems incorporate more than one level of alarm. This allows an ASD system to provide very early warning of an event, prompting investigation at the earliest smouldering stage of a fire when it is easily addressed. Other alarm levels may be configured to provide fire alarm inputs to fire systems as well as releasing suppression systems. ASD alarm sensitivities are configurable and can be programmed to levels ranging from thousands of times more sensitive than a conventional detector, to much less sensitive. The detectors work best in non-volatile environments. They can also be used in computer cabinets to alert users to the overheating of computer cables or individual computer components.

== Installation and placement ==
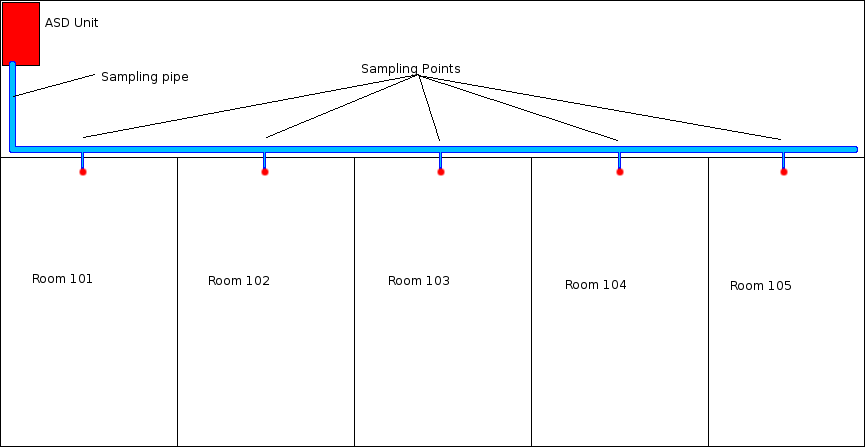
An example of how a simple ASD unit with a single pipe could cover a five-room area

ASDs are suitable for environments where a highly sensitive rapid smoke detection capability is required. This makes them suitable in clean rooms; areas which contain goods easily damaged by fire, such as tobacco, electronic rooms and highly flammable liquid and gases. Often, normal point detectors will recognise the danger too late, as smoke often does not reach the ceiling quickly enough for a fire to be detected in a timely fashion.

As they can be easily hidden, pipe networks are suitable in environments where point detectors can be considered aesthetically displeasing, such as offices, apartments and hotel rooms. This factor also makes them suitable in locations where point detectors can be easily tampered with, such as in correctional facilities.

Despite their high sensitivity ASDs can be used in dusty or dirty environments as long as correct design, installation and maintenance processes are followed. Most ASD products can accommodate a broad range of environments and applications – from both confined and open spaces to the cleanest or dirtiest environment, including telecomm, control rooms, waste treatment, mining and more.

== See also ==
- Carbon monoxide detector
- Heat detector
- Smoke detector
