= First Alert =

American safety equipment brand

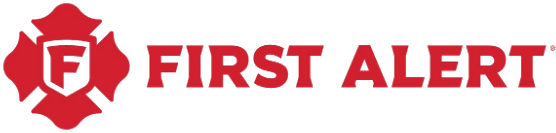
- Company type: Subsidiary
- Industry: Security, fire protection
- Founded: 1958; 68 years ago
- Headquarters: Aurora, IL, United States
- Products: Smoke detectors, carbon monoxide detectors, fire extinguishers, security cameras
- Parent: Resideo
- Website: firstalert.com

First Alert is the retail brand of American safety equipment manufacturer BRK Brands, Inc., established in 1976 and based in Aurora, Illinois, with a production plant in Juarez, Mexico. Products sold with the brand include carbon monoxide detectors, smoke alarms, fire extinguishers, and other safety products like flashlights and fire escape ladders. First Alert supports fire safety in partnership with Safe Kids USA and The United States Fire Administration, providing smoke alarms at reduced cost to low-income families in the United States.

== History ==
- 1958-company created by Burke-Roberts-Kimberline (BRK) Electronics. The three-man team (Burke-Roberts-Kimberline) invented the first battery-powered smoke detector
- 1964- Began commercial manufacturing of the first battery-powered smoke detector
- 1967- Pittway began manufacturing the alarms
- 1974-Sears begins selling the BRK model SS-74R battery powered smoke alarm
- 1992-Sold to T.H. Lee & Associates
- 1998-Sold to Sunbeam Corporation
- 2002-American Household, Inc. is formed from Sunbeam Corporation
- 2005-Jarden Corporation (NYSE: JAH) purchases American Household, Inc.
- 2006-BRK Brands/ First Alert becomes part of Jarden Branded Consumables.
- 2016-Newell Rubbermaid acquires Jarden, including BRK Brands, forming Newell Brands.
- 2022-Resideo Technologies acquires First Alert

== Awards ==
- 2009 DIY, Garden & Housewares "Silver" Industry Award in Security & Safety- Tundra [UK, Europe]
- 2008 Chicago Innovation Award- Tundra
- 2007 International Housewares Show "Best of Show"- Tundra
- 2006 Golden Hammer Gold Level Award Winner
- 2005 Golden Hammer Gold Level Award Winner
- 2004 Golden Hammer Gold Level Award Winner
- 2003 Golden Hammer Gold Level Award Winner
- 2002 SPARC Award Winner
- 2001 Popular Mechanics Editor's Choice Award for SA302
- 2001 Good Housekeeping "Good Buy" Award for SA302
- 1999 CHAMPS Award for winning marketing strategy in the consumer category
- 1999 EFFIE Award for "Be Safe...Replace" campaign, most effective advertising campaign in the health aids category
- 1997 Pinnacle Award for the Standard for Excellence

== Recalls ==
First Alert branded fire extinguishers model FE1A10G with serial numbers beginning with RH, RK, RL, RP, RT, RU, or RW were recalled. Fire Extinguishers were sold from September 1999 through September 2000.

On September 4, 1992, BRK recalled all hardwired smoke alarms under the series 1839I and 2839I due to testing programs determining that corrosion could form on the alarm horn's electrical contacts, causing the piezo to fail to make any noise.

In May 2006, First Alert combination smoke alarms were recalled due to draining batteries rapidly.
