= ADI Global Distribution =

Wholesaler of security products

- Type: Public
- Traded as: NYSE: ADIG; S&P 600 component
- Industry: Wholesale/Electrical, Data, and Security
- Founded: 1987
- Headquarters: Melville, New York
- Number of locations: 190+
- Area served: Worldwide
- Key people: Rob Aarnes (President)
- Products: Control4, Access control and communications, batteries and power supplies, central vacuum, data communications, fire, intrusion and smart home, networking, pro AV, residential AV, structured wiring, tools and hardware, video surveillance, and wire and cable.
- Revenue: $3.4B (2021)
- Number of employees: 2,800+
- Website: adiglobal.com

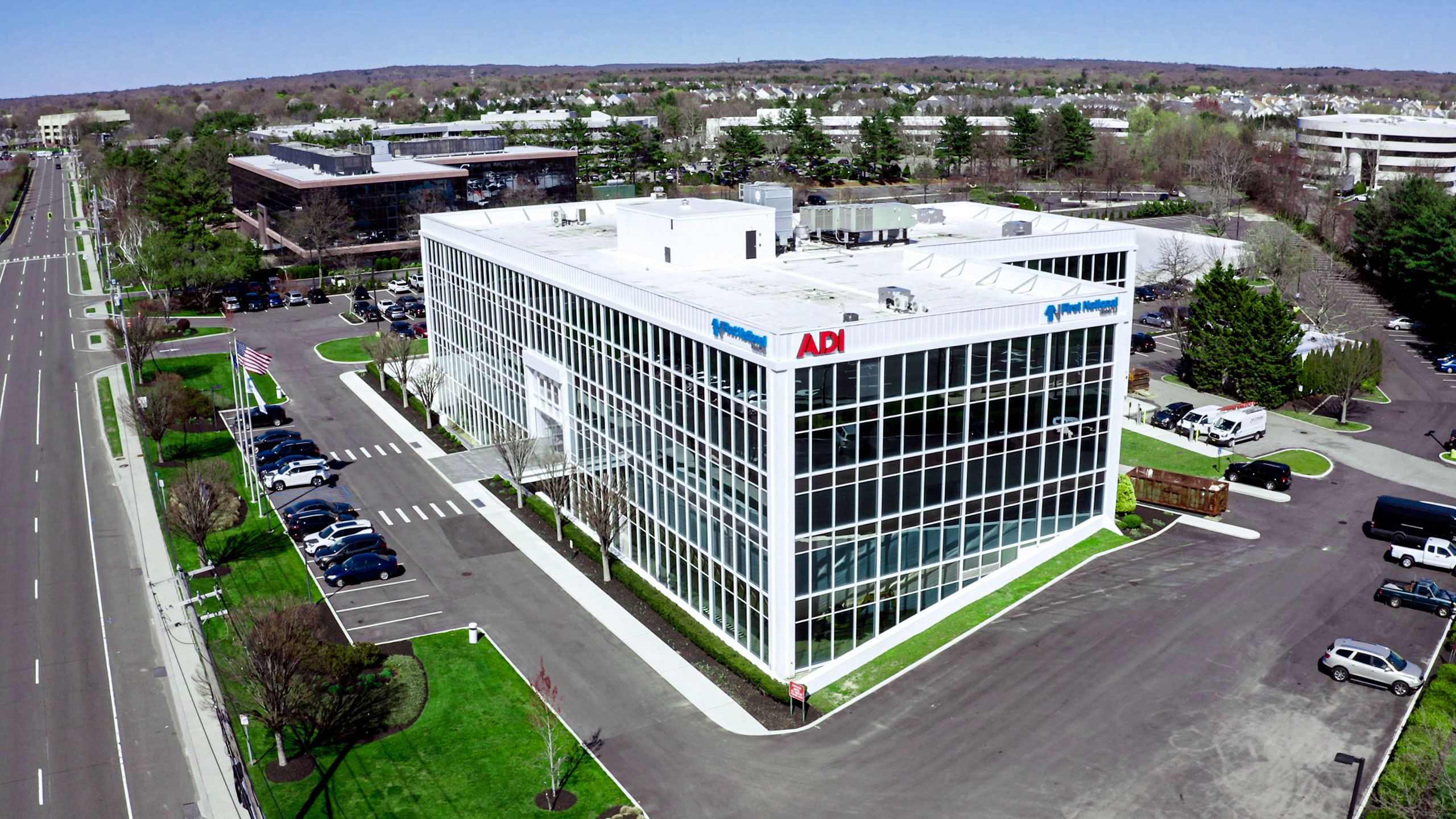
ADI headquarters located in Melville, New York.

ADI Global Distribution is a wholesale distributor of security, pro-AV and low-voltage products for large contractors, installers, and resellers who buy in bulk. The company has over 190 locations throughout North America, Puerto Rico, Europe, the Middle East, and Africa. ADI's inventory includes products such as video surveillance, building access control, home intrusion, fire safety, and alarm systems as well as professional and residential audio/video (AV) equipment such as commercial speakers and video displays, networking equipment, data communications solutions, tools, wire, cabling, and more.

ADI became a division of Ademco Inc., a subsidiary of Honeywell spin-off Resideo Technologies, Inc. in 2018. In August 2026, ADI was spun off from its parent Resideo to begin trading on the New York Stock Exchange.

== History ==
In 1929, New York-based hardware store owner Maurice Coleman founded the Alarm Device Manufacturing Company, or ADEMCO, to build custom alarm systems for local businesses. In 1960, the company went public.

In 1963, ADEMCO was acquired by the Pittsburgh Railway Company, retaining the ADEMCO name to market its security and fire protection products. In 1967, Pittsburgh Railway Company renamed itself Pittway.

Throughout the 1980s, Pittway/ADEMCO acquired other companies, forming ADEMCO Distribution to sell its expanded product line. In 1987, ADEMCO Distribution was renamed ADI.

Honeywell acquired Pittway/ADI in 2000 to expand its footprint in home and building control. In 2006, Honeywell purchased Gardiner Groupe Europe, a distributor of closed-circuit TV (CCTV) systems, fire alarm, intrusion alarm, access control, public address, and integrated systems to bolster ADI's presence in Europe. Honeywell followed this up in 2007 by acquiring Burtek, a British Columbia-based distributor of low-voltage products for commercial and residential audio, burglar and fire alarm, CCTV, access control, and data communications, thus expanding ADI's presence in Canada.

In 2018, Honeywell spun off ADI, along with its home heating, ventilation, air conditioning controls and security manufacturing businesses into Resideo Technologies Inc. On October 29, 2018, Resideo commenced regular way trading on the New York Stock Exchange under the ticker REZI.

On June 17th, 2024, ADI acquired the Control4 Home Automation brand, after parent company Resideo's acquisition of Snap One.

== Products and Services ==
ADI offers low-voltage electronics and related products related to access control and communications, residential AV, pro AV, communications, data communications, fire, intrusion and smart home, networking, power, structured wiring, video surveillance, and wire and cable.

ADI requires prospective customers to register as members to purchase its products.

== Locations ==
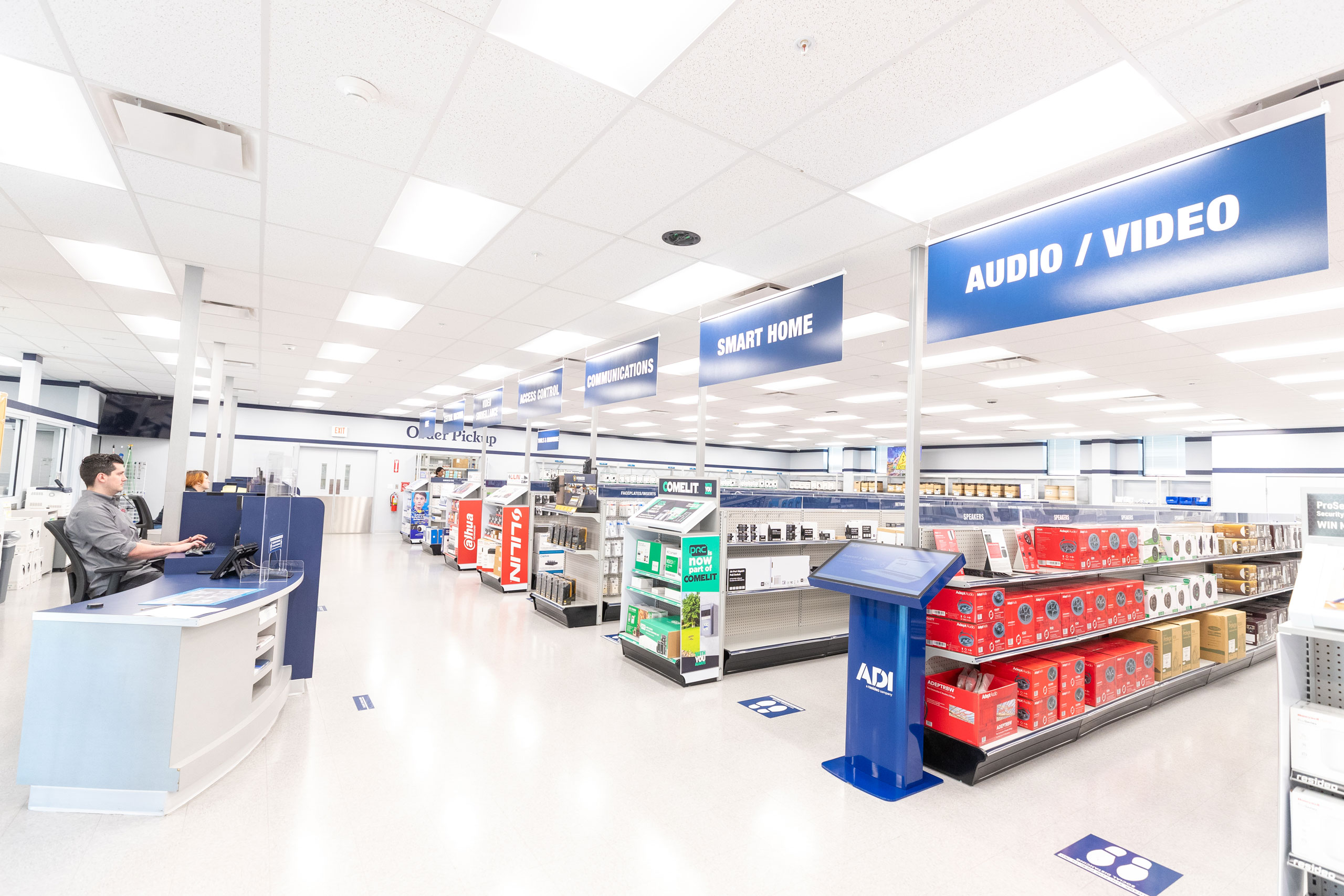
Interior of Fort Worth Texas branch.

ADI Global has branch locations in most major U.S. metropolitan areas and several mid-sized cities, with a total of 100 U.S. stores as of 2021. ADI has a location in San Juan, Puerto Rico, and nine locations in Canada.

ADI has locations throughout Europe, Africa and the Middle East, with stores in Great Britain, Ireland, Sweden, France, Spain, Belgium, Denmark, the Netherlands, Poland, the Czech Republic, Slovakia, the United Arab Emirates and South Africa.
