= AR Homes =

Network of homebuilding companies

AR Homes, formerly Arthur Rutenberg Homes, is one of America's largest network of independently owned and operated custom homebuilding companies. Currently, there are over 40 AR Homes franchises in 10 states. The network operates fully-furnished model homes which are available to tour daily.

The franchisor's home office is located in Clearwater, Florida. The franchisor employs associates in several departments including Design, Interior Design, IT, Marketing, Purchasing and Accounting.

In 1953, founder Arthur Rutenberg moved from Chicago to Florida at age 26 and started his business with one house under the brand name Rutenberg Homes. In 1978, he sold his first franchise. In 1986, Professional Builder magazine named Arthur Rutenberg "National Builder of the Year". In 1993, Builder magazine named Rutenberg a "Legend of Residential Marketing". In 1996, Rutenberg was inducted into the Florida Housing Hall of Fame, and in 2008, was quoted as an expert on the housing industry slump in the Saint Petersburg Times, the Sarasota Herald-Tribune, and the Orlando Sentinel. Both the Sentinel and Tampa Bay Home Seeker have called Rutenberg a "legendary builder." The Tampa Bay Business Journal recognized Arthur Rutenberg Homes as one of 2013's Top 100 Fastest Growing Companies in Florida.

Founder Arthur Rutenberg died on March 29, 2017.
