= IBAHN =

iBAHN
- Company type: Privately held corporation
- Industry: Internet service provider, Hospitality
- Founded: 1998
- Headquarters: South Jordan, Utah
- Number of employees: 400
- Website: www.ibahn.com

iBAHN is a global provider of digital information and entertainment systems for the hospitality and meeting industries. They have approximately 400 employees spread over 17 regional offices throughout North America, Asia and Europe. They offer services to more than 3,000 hotels in 40+ countries. In March 2014, following Chapter 11 Bankruptcy proceedings, the company was purchased by rival Guest-tek.

== History ==
Founded in February 1998 as STSN (Suite Technology Systems Network), the company was an Internet service provider focused on providing high-speed wired and wireless Internet service to hotels. Their first major client was Marriott Corporation, who signed a deal in 1999 to have STSN install high-speed Internet services in roughly 500 hotels.

In December 2002, STSN announced that they were one of several firms invested in by Intel Communications Fund in order to "accelerate Intel voice and data communications and wireless networking initiatives." A substantial portion of this investment went towards the installation of WiFi services in nearly 400 Marriott hotels.

Rebranded as iBahn in 2005, the company has seen rapid expansion and has since expanded their product offering to include client and guest services and augmented conference and meeting solutions. They have also expanded their client base from strictly hotels and hospitality to corporate and government campuses and events.

Current clients include Bank of America, Boeing Travel Group, eBay, General Electric, IBM, Intel, Kraft Foods, Marriott International, McDonald's, Microsoft, Quantum, State Farm Insurance, the United States Army, Trident Hotels and Verizon.

Investors include Siemens, On Command (now LodgeNet), Marriott International, Intel, Vantage Point Venture Partners, APV Technology Partners, and ThomVest Holdings Inc.

== Products ==
iBAHN produces a line of IP platform-based solutions for the hospitality and meeting industries in addition to "high-speed" wired and wireless Internet service.
