= Smoke detector =

Device that detects smoke, typically as an indicator of fire

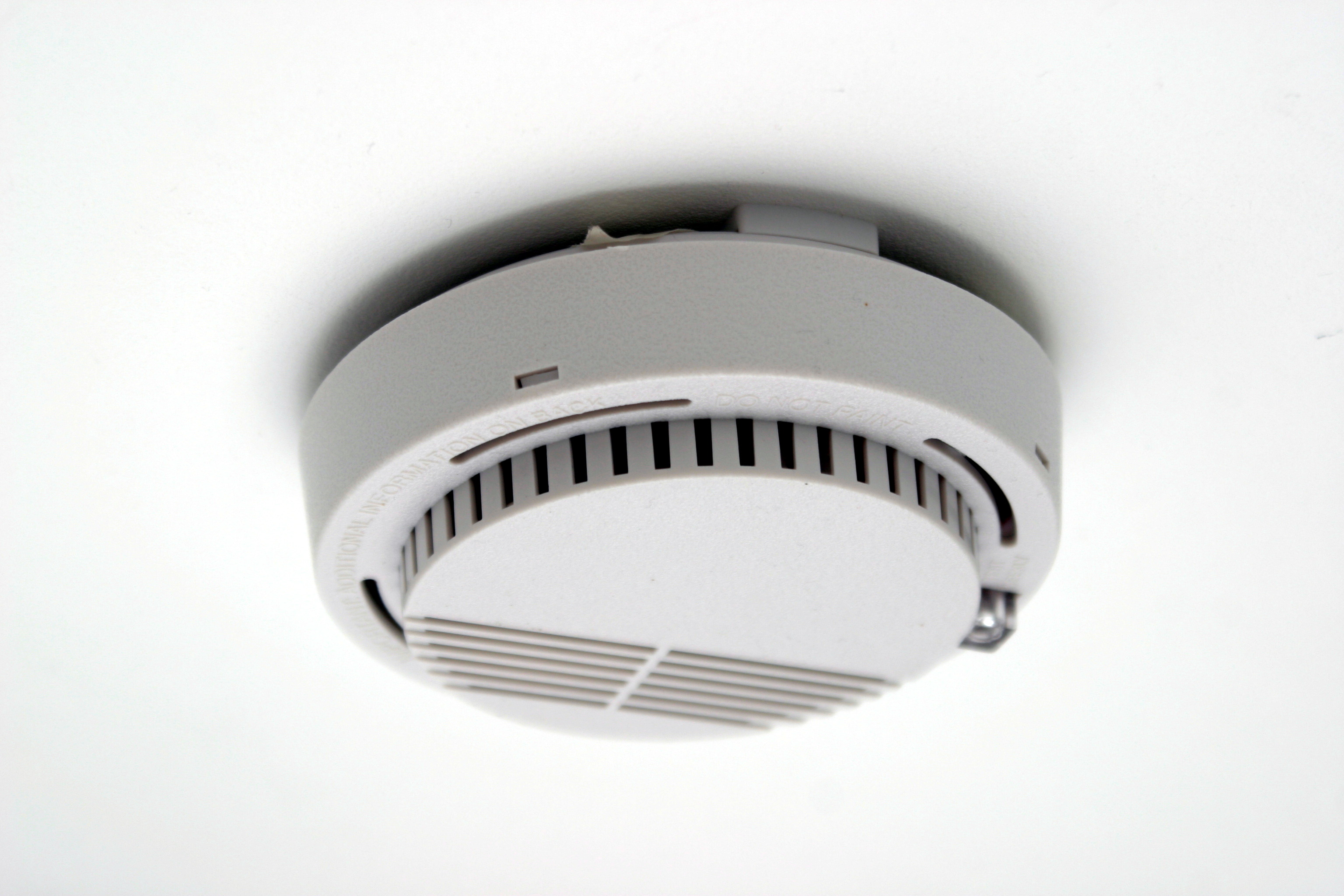
Smoke detector mounted on a ceiling

A smoke detector is a device that detects smoke, typically as an indicator of fire. Smoke detectors/alarms are usually housed in plastic enclosures, typically shaped like a disk about 125 millimetres (5 in) in diameter and 25 millimetres (1 in) thick, but shape and size vary. Smoke can be detected either optically (photoelectric) or by physical process (ionization). Detectors may use one or both detecting methods. Sensitive detectors can be used to detect and deter smoking in banned areas. Smoke detectors in large commercial and industrial buildings are usually connected to a central fire alarm system.

Household smoke detectors, also known as smoke alarms, generally issue an audible or visual alarm from the detector itself or several detectors if there are multiple devices interconnected. Household smoke detectors range from individual battery-powered units to several interlinked units with battery backup. With interlinked units, if any unit detects smoke, alarms will trigger all of the units. This happens even if household power has gone out.

Residential smoke alarms are usually powered with a 9-volt battery, a non-removable "10 Year Sealed" battery, or by mains electricity. Some smoke alarms use a combination of the two, usually using a battery as an extra power source should loss of mains power occur. Commercial smoke detectors issue a signal to a fire alarm control panel as part of a fire alarm system. Usually, an individual commercial smoke detector unit does not issue an alarm; some, however, have built-in sounders.

The risk of dying in a residential fire is cut in half in houses with working smoke detectors. The US National Fire Protection Association reports 0.53 deaths per 100 fires in homes with working smoke detectors compared to 1.18 deaths without (2009–2013). Smoke detectors are not suitable for every location in a building, for instance in a kitchen of a domestic property, where a heat detector would be more suitable instead.

== History ==
The first automatic electric fire alarm was patented in 1890 by Francis Robbins Upton, an associate of Thomas Edison. In 1902, George Andrew Darby patented the first European electrical heat detector in Birmingham, England. In the late 1930s, Swiss physicist Walter Jaeger attempted to invent a detector for poison gas. He expected the gas entering the detector to bind to ionized air molecules and thereby alter an electric current in a circuit of the instrument. However, his device did not achieve its purpose as small concentrations of gas did not affect the detector's conductivity. Frustrated, Jaeger lit a cigarette and was surprised to notice that a meter on the instrument had registered a drop in current. Unlike poison gas, the smoke particles from his cigarette were able to alter the circuit's current. Jaeger's experiment was one of the developments that paved the way for the modern smoke detector. In 1939, Swiss physicist Ernst Meili devised an ionization chamber device capable of detecting combustible gases in mines. He also invented a cold cathode tube that could amplify the small signal generated by the detection mechanism so that it was strong enough to activate an alarm.

In 1951, ionization smoke detectors were first sold in the United States. In the following years, they were used only in major commercial and industrial facilities due to their large size and high cost. In 1955, simple "fire detectors" for homes were developed, which detected high temperatures. In 1963, The United States Atomic Energy Commission (USAEC) granted the first license to distribute smoke detectors that used radioactive material. In 1965, the first low-cost smoke detector for domestic use was developed by Duane D. Pearsall and Stanley Bennett Peterson. It was an individual, replaceable, battery-powered unit that could be easily installed. The "SmokeGard 700" was beehive-shaped, fire-resistant, and made of steel. The company began mass-producing these units in 1975. Studies in the 1960s determined that smoke detectors respond to fires much faster than heat detectors.

The first single-station smoke detector was invented in 1970 and was brought out the next year. It was an ionization detector powered by a single 9-volt battery. It cost about US$125 (equivalent to $1,036 in 2025) and sold at a rate of a few hundred thousand units per year. Several developments in smoke detector technology occurred between 1971 and 1976, including the replacement of cold-cathode tubes with solid-state electronics. This greatly reduced the detectors' cost and size and made it possible to monitor battery life. The previous alarm horns which required special batteries were replaced with horns that were more energy-efficient and allowed the use of widely available batteries. These detectors could also function with smaller amounts of radioactive source material, and the detecting chamber and smoke detector enclosure were redesigned to make the operation more effective. The rechargeable batteries were often replaced by a pair of AA batteries along with a plastic shell encasing the detector.

The photoelectric (optical) smoke detector was invented by Robert Enemark and Donald Steele from Electro Signal Lab and patented in 1972. The 10-year-lithium-battery-powered smoke alarm was introduced years later, in 1995.

== Types ==
Smoke can be detected using a photoelectric detector or an ionization process. Fire without smoke can be detected by detecting carbon dioxide. Incomplete burning can be detected by detecting carbon monoxide.

=== Photoelectric ===
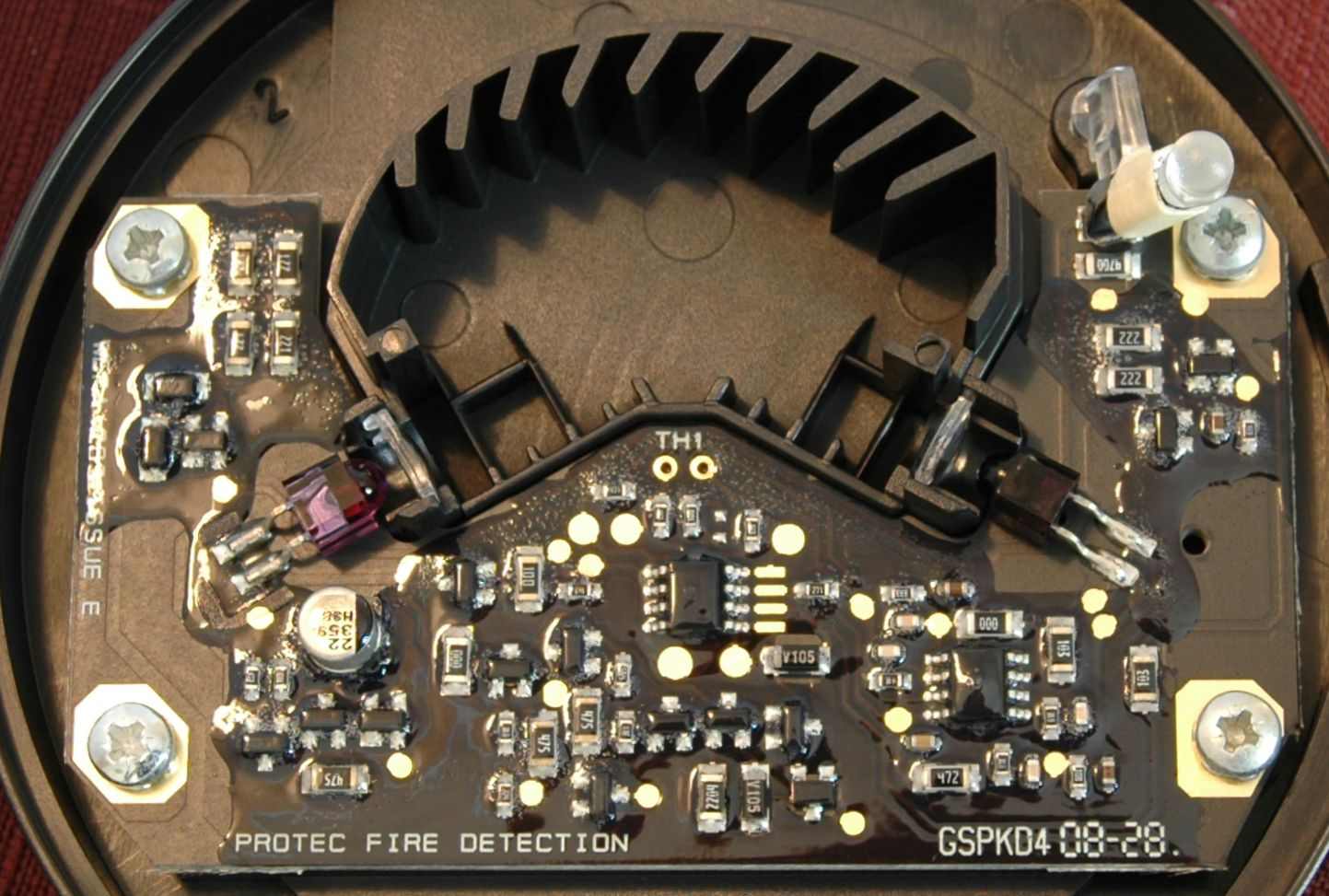
Optical smoke detector with the cover removed; the angled plastic in an arc across the top is a light baffle

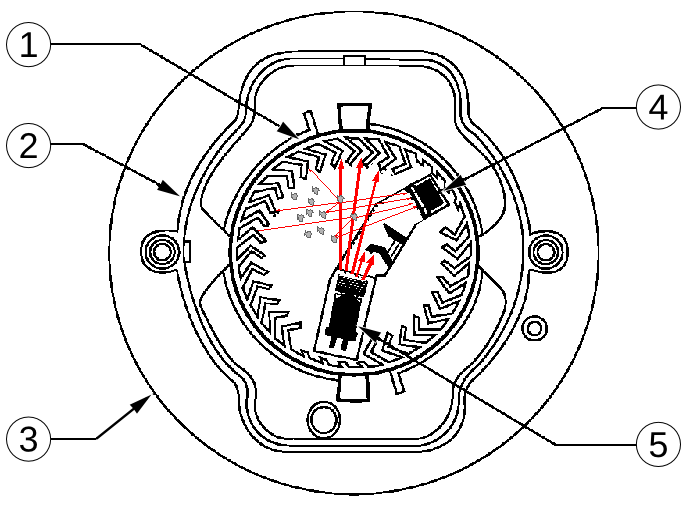
Optical smoke detector: 1. Optical chamber; 2. Cover; 3. Case moulding; 4. Photodiode (transducer); 5. Infrared LED

A photoelectric, or optical smoke detector, contains a source of infrared, visible, or ultraviolet light—typically an incandescent light bulb or light-emitting diode (LED)—a lens, and a photoelectric receiver—typically a photodiode. In spot-type detectors, all of these components are arranged inside a chamber that admits air from the environment, including smoke if present. In large open areas such as atria and auditoriums, optical beam or projected-beam smoke detectors are used instead of a chamber within the unit: a wall-mounted unit emits a beam of infrared or ultraviolet light which is either received and processed by a separate device or reflected to the receiver by a reflector. In some types, particularly optical beam types, the light emitted by the light source passes through the air being tested and reaches the photodetector. The received light intensity will be reduced due to scattering from particulates of smoke, air-borne dust, or other substances; the circuitry detects the light intensity and generates the alarm if it is below a specified threshold, potentially due to smoke.

In other types, typically chamber types, the light source is directed away from the detector, and detects no reflected light in the absence of particles. However, once the air in the chamber contains particles (smoke or dust), the light is scattered with some of it reflected back to the detector, triggering the alarm.

According to the National Fire Protection Association (NFPA), "photoelectric smoke detection is generally more responsive to fires that begin with a long period of smoldering". Studies by Texas A&M University and the NFPA cited by the City of Palo Alto, California, state, "Photoelectric alarms react slower to rapidly growing fires than ionization alarms, but laboratory and field tests have shown that photoelectric smoke alarms provide adequate warning for all types of fires and have been shown to be far less likely to be deactivated by occupants."

Although photoelectric alarms are highly effective at detecting smoldering fires and do provide adequate protection from flaming fires, fire safety experts and the NFPA recommend installing what are called combination alarms, which are alarms that either detect both heat and smoke or use both the ionization (below) and photoelectric smoke detecting methods. Some combination alarms may also include a carbon monoxide detection capability.

The type and detectivity of light source and photoelectric detector and type of smoke chamber differ between manufacturers.

=== Ionization ===
A video overview of how an ionization smoke detector works

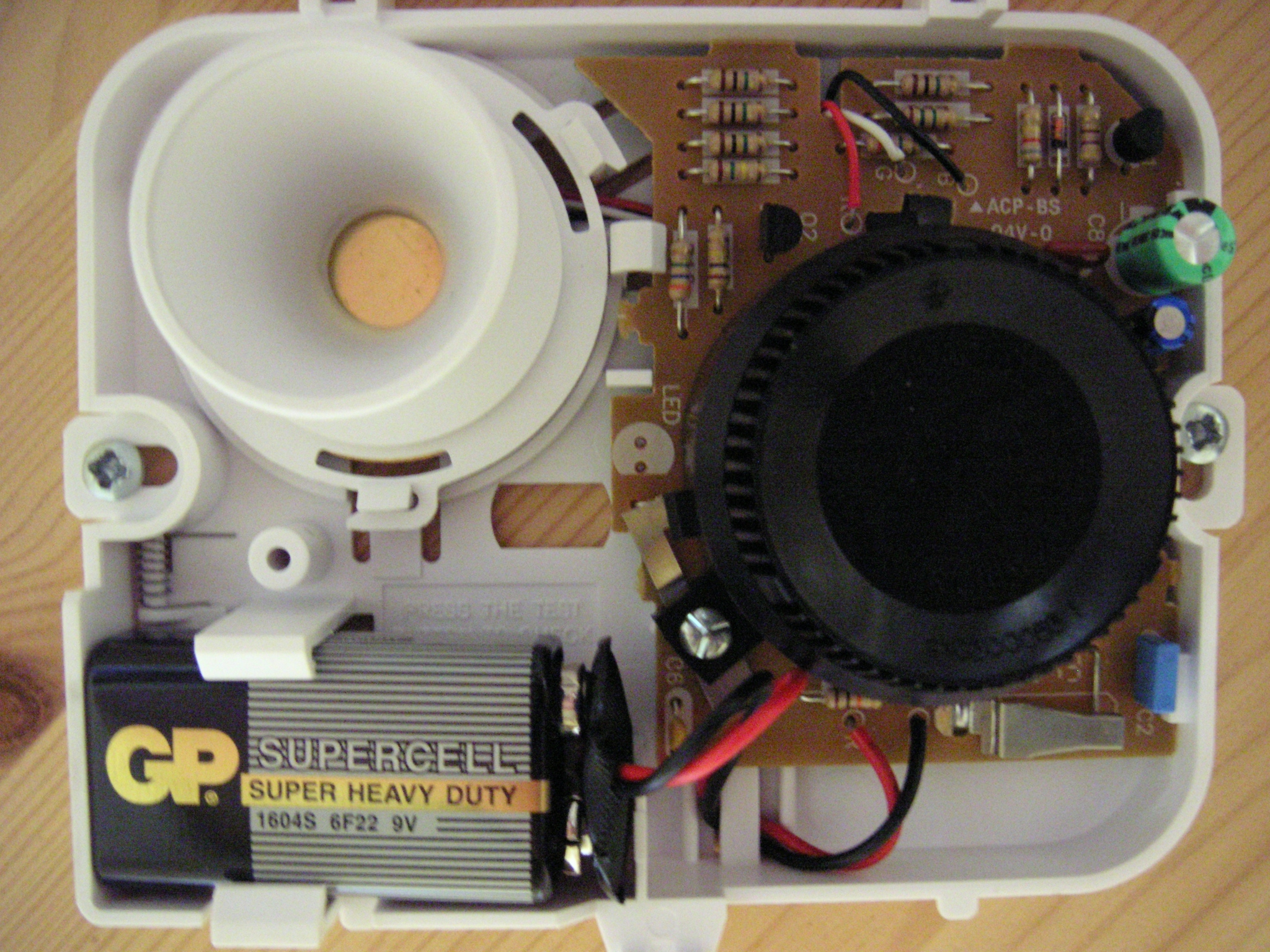
Inside a basic ionization smoke detector. The black, round structure at the right is the ionization chamber. The white, round structure at the upper left is the piezoelectric horn that produces the alarm sound.

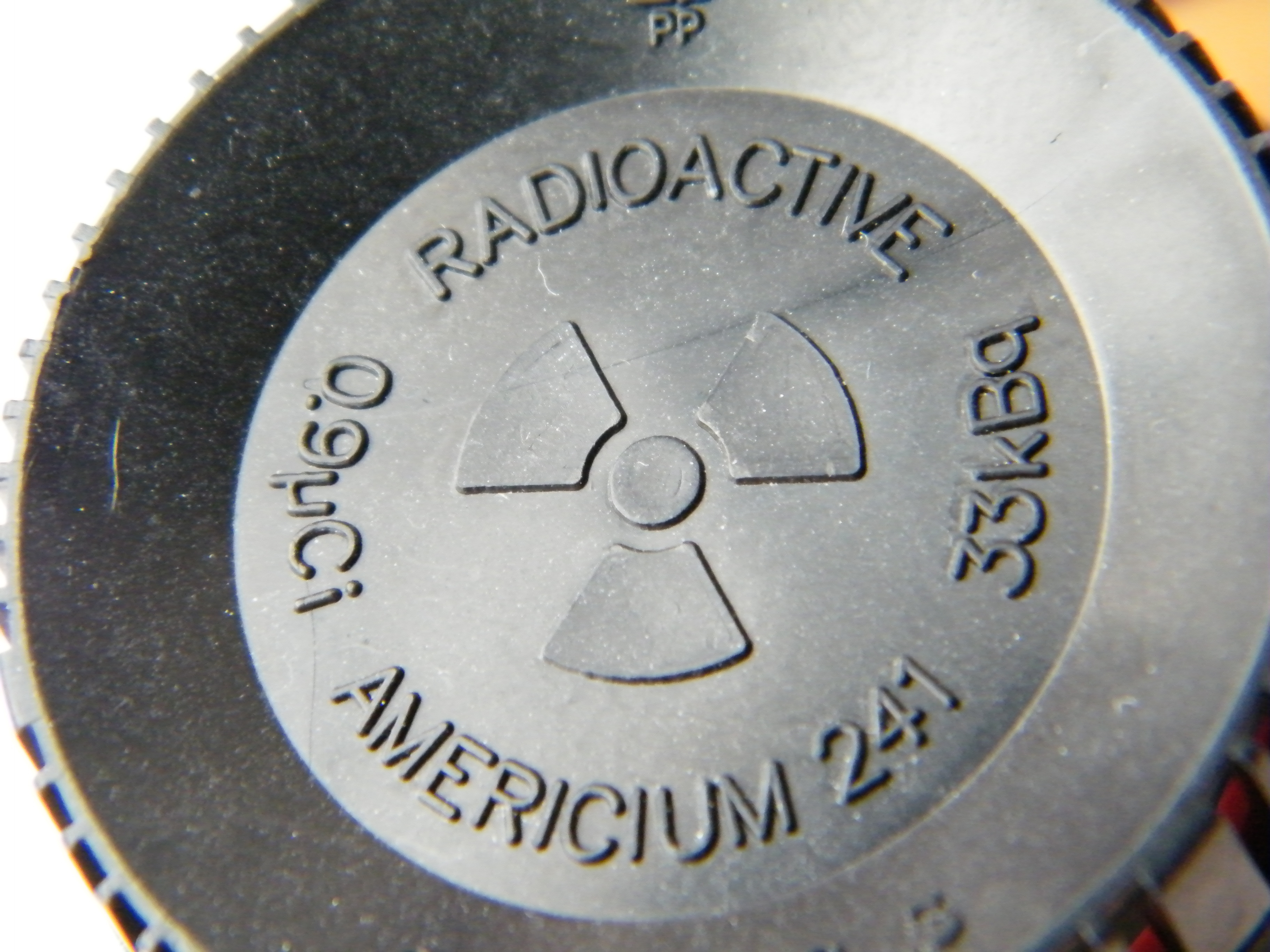
An americium container from a smoke detector

An ionization smoke detector uses a radioisotope, typically americium-241, to ionize air; a difference in current due to the presence of smoke is detected and an alarm is generated. Ionization detectors are more sensitive to the flaming stage of fires than optical detectors, while optical detectors are more sensitive to fires in the early smouldering stage.

The smoke detector has two ionization chambers, one open to the air and one closed as a reference that does not allow the entry of particles. The radioactive source emits alpha particles into both chambers, which ionizes some air molecules. There is a potential difference (voltage) between pairs of electrodes in the chambers; the electrical charge on the ions allows an electric current to flow. The currents in both chambers should be the same as they are equally affected by air pressure, temperature, and the diminishing radioactivity of the source. If any smoke particles enter the open chamber, some of the ions will attach to the particles and not be available to carry the current in that chamber. An electronic circuit detects the difference in current between the open and sealed chambers, and sounds the alarm. The circuitry also monitors the battery used to supply or back up power. It sounds an intermittent warning when power nears exhaustion. A user-operated test button simulates an imbalance between the ionization chambers and sounds the alarm if and only if the power supply, electronics, and alarm device are functional. The current drawn by an ionization smoke detector is low enough for a small battery used as a sole or backup power supply to be able to provide power for years without the need for external wiring.

Ionization smoke detectors are usually less expensive to manufacture than optical detectors. Ionization detectors may be more prone than photoelectric detectors to false alarms triggered by non-hazardous events, and are much slower to respond to typical house fires:"In smoldering tests, the average time to first alarm was 2489 s ± 1324 s for ionization alarms and 1927 s ± 1065 s for photoelectric alarms."

==== Radiation ====
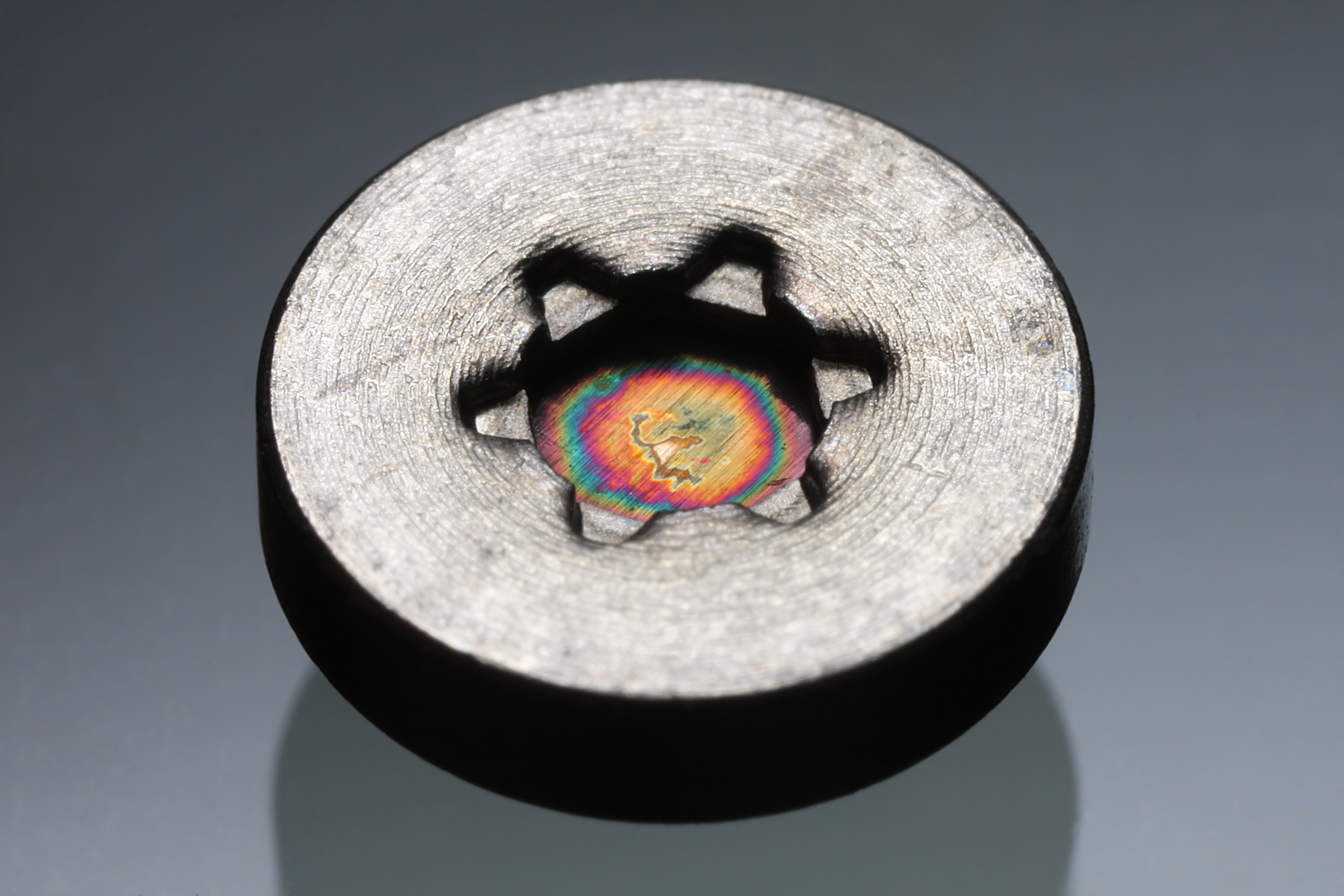
A 141 ng speck of americium-241 dioxide on a coin-sized aluminum button

Americium-241 is an alpha emitter with a half-life of 432.6 years. Alpha particle radiation, as opposed to beta (electron) and gamma (electromagnetic) radiation, is used for two reasons: the alpha particles can ionize enough air to make a detectable current; and they have low penetrative power, meaning they will be stopped, safely, by the air or the plastic shell of the smoke detector. During the alpha decay, ^{241}Am emits gamma radiation, but it is low-energy and therefore not considered a significant contributor to human exposure. (Note: A study published by Argonne National Laboratory evaluates the exposure risk as low but cites 33 keV as the primary component of gamma radiation. "Radiological and Chemical Fact Sheets to Support Health Risk Analyses for Contaminated Areas" (PDF). United States Department of Health and Human Services Radiation Emergency Medical Management. Argonne National Laboratory. August 2005. p. 5.) (Note: According to the physical study cited at Americium-241#Decay, the primary component of the gamma radiation is 60 keV.)

The amount of elemental americium-241 in ionization smoke detectors is small enough to be exempt from the regulations applied to larger radioactive sources. A smoke detector contains about 37 kBq (1,000 nCi) of radioactive element americium-241 (^{241}Am), corresponding to about 0.3 μg of the isotope. This provides sufficient ion current to detect smoke while producing a very low level of radiation outside the device. Some Russian-made smoke detectors, most notably the RID-6m and IDF-1m models, contain a small amount of plutonium, rather than the typical ^{241}Am source, in the form of reactor-grade ^{239}Pu mixed with titanium dioxide onto a cylindrical alumina surface.

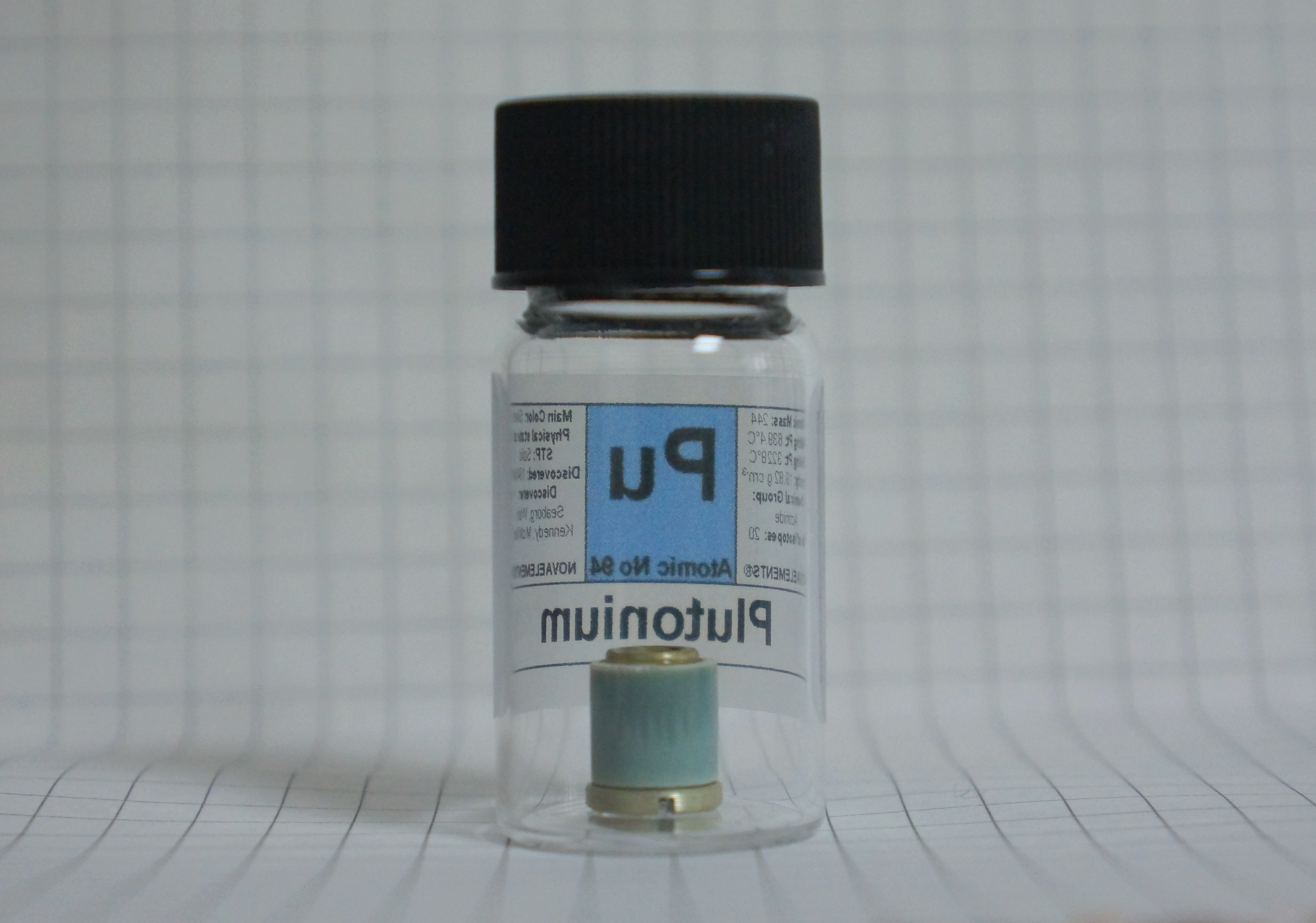
A RID-6M smoke detector reference plutonium source, with an initial ²³⁹Pu activity of 5.7 μCi.

The amount of americium-241 contained in ionizing smoke detectors does not represent a significant radiological hazard. If the americium is left in the shielded ionization chamber of the alarm, the radiological risk is insignificant because the chamber acts as a shield to the alpha radiation. A person would have to open the sealed chamber and ingest or inhale the americium for the dose to be comparable to natural background radiation. The radiation risk of exposure to an ionizing smoke detector operating normally is much smaller than natural background radiation.

==== Disposal ====
Disposal regulations and recommendations for ionization smoke detectors vary from region to region. In New South Wales, Australia smoke detectors should be taken to a Household Chemical CleanOut event or a Community Recycling Centre. The U.S. EPA considers ionizing smoke detectors safe to dispose with household trash. Alternatively, smoke detectors can be returned to the manufacturer.

=== Performance differences ===
Photoelectric detectors and ionization detectors differ in their performance depending on the type of smoke generated by a fire.

A presentation by Siemens and the Canadian Fire Alarm Association reports that the ionization detector is the best at detecting incipient-stage fires with invisibly small particles, fast-flaming fires with smaller 0.01–0.4 micron particles, and dark or black smoke, while more modern photoelectric detectors are best at detecting slow-smouldering fires with larger 0.4–10.0 micron particles, and light-coloured white/grey smoke.

Photoelectric smoke detectors respond faster to fire that is in its early, smoldering stage. The smoke from the smoldering stage of a fire is typically made up of large combustion particles between 0.3 and 10.0 μm. Ionization smoke detectors respond faster (typically 30–60 seconds) to the flaming stage of a fire. The smoke from the flaming stage of a fire is typically made up of microscopic combustion particles between 0.01 and 0.3 μm. Also, ionization detectors are weaker in high airflow environments.

Some European countries, including France, and some US states and municipalities have banned the use of domestic ionization smoke alarms because of concerns that they are not reliable enough as compared to other technologies. Where an ionizing smoke detector has been the only detector, fires in the early stages have not always been effectively detected.

In June 2006, the Australasian Fire & Emergency Service Authorities Council (AFAC), the peak representative body for all Australian and New Zealand fire departments, published an official report, 'Position on Smoke Alarms in Residential Accommodation'. Clause 3.0 states, "Ionization smoke alarms may not operate in time to alert occupants to escape from a smoldering fire".

In August 2008, the International Association of Fire Fighters (IAFF) passed a resolution recommending the use of photoelectric smoke alarms, saying that changing to photoelectric alarms would "drastically reduce the loss of life among citizens and firefighters".

In May 2011, the Fire Protection Association of Australia's (FPAA) official position on smoke alarms stated, "The Fire Prevention Association of Australia considers that all residential buildings should be fitted with photoelectric smoke alarms". In December of the same year, the Volunteer Firefighter's Association of Australia published a World Fire Safety Foundation report, "Ionization Smoke Alarms are DEADLY", citing research outlining substantial performance differences between ionization and photoelectric technology.

In November 2013, the Ohio Fire Chiefs' Association (OFCA) published a position paper supporting the use of photoelectric technology in Ohioan residences. The OFCA's position states, "In the interest of public safety and to protect the public from the deadly effects of smoke and fire, the Ohio Fire Chiefs' Association endorses the use of photoelectric smoke alarms in both new construction and when replacing old smoke alarms or purchasing new alarms."

In June 2014, tests by the Northeastern Ohio Fire Prevention Association (NEOFPA) on residential smoke alarms were broadcast on ABC's Good Morning America program. The NEOFPA tests showed ionization smoke alarms were failing to activate in the early, smoldering stage of a fire. The combination ionization/photoelectric alarms failed to activate for an average of over 20 minutes after the stand-alone photoelectric smoke alarms. This vindicated the June 2006 official position of the Australasian Fire & Emergency Service Authorities Council and the October 2008 official position of the International Association of Fire Fighters (IAFF). Both the AFAC and the IAFF recommend photoelectric smoke alarms, but not combination ionization/photoelectric smoke alarms.

According to fire tests conformant to EN 54, the CO_{2} cloud from open fire can usually be detected before particulates. Due to the varying levels of detection capabilities between detector types, manufacturers have designed multi-criteria devices which cross-reference the separate signals to both rule out false alarms and improve response times to real fires. Obscuration is a unit of measurement that has become the standard way of specifying smoke detectors' detectivity. Obscuration is the effect smoke has in reducing light intensity, expressed in percent absorption per unit length; higher concentrations of smoke result in higher obscuration levels.

Typical smoke detector obscuration ratings
Detector type	Obscuration
Photoelectric	0.70–13.0% obs/m (0.2–4.0% obs/ft)
Ionization	2.6–5.0% obs/m (0.8–1.5% obs/ft)
Aspirating	0.005–20.5% obs/m (0.0015–6.25% obs/ft)
Laser	0.06–6.41% obs/m (0.02–2.0% obs/ft)

=== Carbon monoxide and carbon dioxide detection ===
Carbon monoxide detectors detect potentially fatal concentrations of carbon monoxide, which may build up due to faulty ventilation where there are combustion appliances such as gas heaters and cookers, although there is no uncontrolled fire outside the appliance.

High levels of carbon dioxide (CO_{2}) may indicate a fire, and can be detected by a carbon dioxide detector. Such detectors are often used to measure levels of CO_{2} which may be undesirable and harmful, but not indicative of a fire. This type of detector can also be used to detect and warn of the much higher levels of CO_{2} generated by a fire. Some manufacturers say that detectors based on CO_{2} levels are the fastest fire indicators. Unlike ionization and optical detectors, they can also detect fires that do not generate smoke, such as those fueled by alcohol or gasoline. CO_{2} detectors are not susceptible to false alarms due to particles making them particularly suitable for use in dusty and dirty environments.

== Residential ==
Smoke alarm systems used in a home or residential environment are typically smaller and less expensive than commercial units. The system may include one or more individual standalone units, or multiple, interconnected units. They typically generate a loud acoustic warning signal as their only action. Several detectors (whether standalone or interconnected) are normally used in the rooms of a dwelling. There are inexpensive smoke alarms that may be interconnected so that any detector triggers all alarms. They may be powered by mains electricity, with disposable or rechargeable battery backup, or with a non-removable battery that lasts for the device lifetime (typically 10 years). They may be interconnected by wires, or wirelessly. They are required in new installations in some jurisdictions.

Several smoke detection methods are used and documented in industry specifications published by Underwriters Laboratories. Alerting methods include:

- Audible tones
  - Varies between 2,900 and 3,500 Hz depending on brand and model name
  - 95 dB loudness at 3 ft, can vary between brands and models.
- Spoken voice alert
- Visual strobe lights
  - 177 candela output
- Emergency light for illumination
- Tactile stimulation (e.g. bed or pillow shaker), although no standards existed as of 2008 for tactile stimulation alarm devices

Some models have a hush or temporary silence feature that allows silencing, typically by pressing a button on the housing, without removing the battery. This is especially useful in locations where false alarms can be relatively common (e.g. near a kitchen), or situations where users might remove the battery permanently to avoid the annoyance of false alarms, preventing the alarm from detecting a fire should one break out.

While current technology is very effective at detecting smoke and fire conditions, the deaf and hard-of-hearing community has raised concerns about the effectiveness of the alerting function in awakening sleeping individuals in certain high-risk groups. People part of groups like the elderly, those with hearing loss, and those who are intoxicated, may have a more difficult time using sound-based detectors. Between 2005 and 2007, research sponsored by the United States National Fire Protection Association (NFPA) focused on understanding the cause of the higher number of deaths in such high-risk groups. Initial research into the effectiveness of the various alerting methods is sparse. Research findings suggest that a mid-frequency (520 Hz) square wave output is significantly more effective at awakening high-risk individuals. Wireless smoke and carbon monoxide detectors linked to alert mechanisms such as vibrating pillow pads for the hearing impaired, strobes, and remote warning handsets are more effective at waking people with serious hearing loss than other alarms.

=== Batteries ===
Audio of a smoke detector with low power

Batteries are used either as sole or as backup power for residential smoke detectors. Mains-operated detectors have disposable or rechargeable batteries as a backup. Purely battery-powered detectors typically use either a 9-volt disposable battery that must be replaced every one to two years, or a non-replaceable lithium battery that lasts about 10 years, meaning the detector must be replaced when the battery runs low. User-replaceable disposable 9-volt lithium batteries, which last at least twice as long as alkaline batteries, are also available for smoke detectors.

When the battery is exhausted, a battery-only smoke detector becomes inactive; most smoke detectors chirp repeatedly if the battery is low in power. It has been found that battery-powered smoke detectors in many houses have dead batteries. It has been estimated that in the UK, over 30% of smoke alarms have dead or removed batteries. In response public information campaigns have been created to remind people to change smoke detector batteries regularly, if they use replaceable batteries. In Australia, for example, a public information campaign suggests that smoke alarm batteries should be replaced on April Fools' Day every year. In regions using daylight saving time, campaigns may suggest that people change their batteries when they change their clocks or on a birthday.

The US National Fire Protection Association (NFPA) recommends that homeowners replace smoke detector batteries at least once per year, or sooner if they start chirping (a signal that the battery is low on power output). Batteries should also be replaced when or if they fail a test, which the NFPA recommends to be carried out at least once per month by pressing the "test" button on the alarm.

=== Reliability ===
A 2004 NIST report concluded that "Smoke alarms of either the ionization type or the photoelectric type consistently provided time for occupants to escape from most residential fires," and, "Consistent with prior findings, ionization type alarms provided somewhat better response to flaming fires than photoelectric alarms (57 to 62 seconds faster response), and photoelectric alarms provided (often) considerably faster response to smoldering fires than ionization type alarms (47 to 53 minutes faster response)."

Regular cleaning can prevent false alarms caused by the build-up of dust and insects, particularly on optical-type alarms as they are more susceptible to these factors. A vacuum cleaner can be used to clean domestic smoke detectors to remove detrimental dust. Optical detectors are less susceptible to false alarms in locations such as near a kitchen producing cooking fumes.

On the night of May 31, 2001, Bill Hackert and his daughter Christine of Rotterdam, New York, died when their house caught fire and a First Alert brand ionization smoke detector failed to sound. The cause of the fire was a frayed electrical cord behind a couch that smoldered for hours before engulfing the house with flames and smoke. The ionization smoke detector was found to be defectively designed, and in 2006 a jury in the United States District Court for the Northern District of New York decided that First Alert, and its then parent company, BRK Brands, was liable for millions of dollars in damages.

=== Installation and placement ===
A 2007 U.S. guide to placing smoke detectors, suggesting that one be placed on every floor of a building, and in each bedroom

In the United States most state and local laws regarding the required number and placement of smoke detectors are based upon standards established in NFPA 72, National Fire Alarm and Signaling Code. Laws governing the installation of smoke detectors vary depending on the locality. However, some rules and guidelines for existing homes are relatively consistent throughout the developed world. For example, Canada and Australia require a building to have a working smoke detector on every level. The United States NFPA code, cited earlier, requires smoke detectors on every habitable level and within the vicinity of all bedrooms. Habitable levels include attics that are tall enough to allow access. Many other countries have comparable requirements.

In new construction, minimum requirements are typically more stringent. For example, all smoke detectors must be hooked directly to the electrical wiring, be interconnected and have a battery backup. In addition, typically, smoke detectors are required either inside or outside every bedroom, depending on local codes. Smoke detectors on the outside will detect fires more quickly, assuming the fire does not begin in the bedroom, but the sound of the alarm will be reduced and may not wake some people. Some areas also require smoke detectors in stairways, main hallways and garages.

A dozen or more detectors may be connected via wiring or wirelessly such that if one detects smoke, the alarms will sound on all the detectors in the network, improving the likelihood that occupants will be alerted even if smoke is detected far from their location. Wired interconnection is more practical in new construction than for existing buildings.

In the UK, the installation of smoke alarms in new builds must comply with British Standard BS5839 pt6. BS 5839: Pt.6: 2004, which recommends that a new-build property consisting of no more than 3 floors (less than 200 square metres per floor) should be fitted with a Grade D, LD2 system. Building Regulations in England, Wales and Scotland recommend that BS 5839: Pt.6 should be followed, but as a minimum a Grade D, LD3 system should be installed. Building Regulations in Northern Ireland require a Grade D, LD2 system to be installed, with smoke alarms fitted in the escape routes and the main living room and a heat alarm in the kitchen; this standard also requires all detectors to have a mains supply and a battery backup.

== Commercial ==
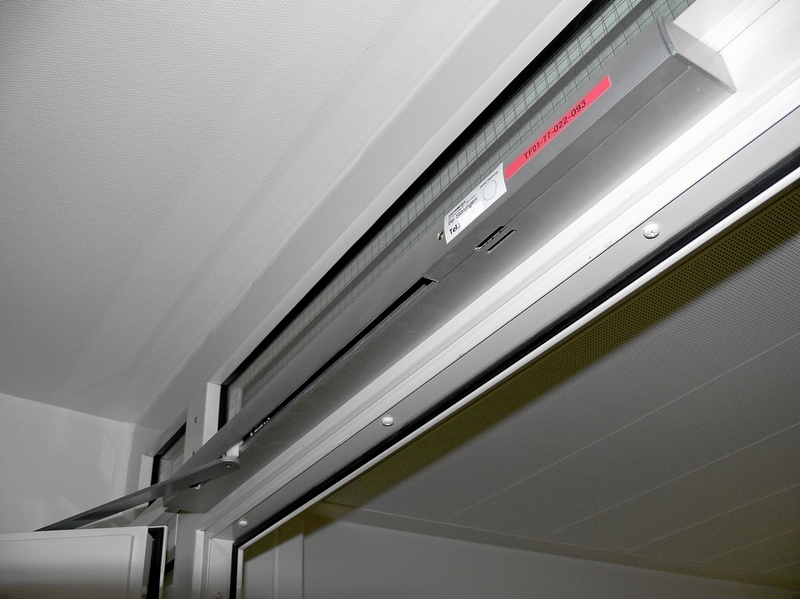
An integrated locking mechanism for commercial building doors. Inside an enclosure are a locking device, smoke detector and power supply.

Commercial smoke detectors are either conventional or addressable, and are connected to security alarm or fire alarm systems controlled by fire alarm control panels (FACP). These are the most common type of detector and are usually significantly more expensive than single-station battery-operated residential smoke alarms. They are used in most commercial and industrial facilities and other places such as ships and trains, but are also part of some security alarm systems in homes. These detectors do not need to have built-in alarms, as alarm systems can be controlled by the connected FACP, which will set off relevant alarms, and can also implement complex functions such as a staged evacuation.

=== Conventional ===
The word "conventional" is slang used to distinguish the method used to communicate with the control unit in newer addressable systems. So-called "conventional detectors" are smoke detectors used in older interconnected systems and resemble electrical switches by their way of working. These detectors are connected in parallel to the signaling path so that the current flow is monitored to indicate a closure of the circuit path by any connected detector when smoke or other similar environmental stimuli sufficiently influences any detector. The resulting increase in current flow (or a dead short) is interpreted and processed by the control unit as a confirmation of the presence of smoke and a fire alarm signal is generated. In a conventional system, smoke detectors are typically wired together in each zone and a single fire alarm control panel usually monitors several zones which can be arranged to correspond to different areas of a building. In the event of a fire, the control panel can identify which zone or zones contain the detector or detectors in alarm. However, they cannot identify which individual detector or detectors are in a state of alarm.

=== Addressable ===
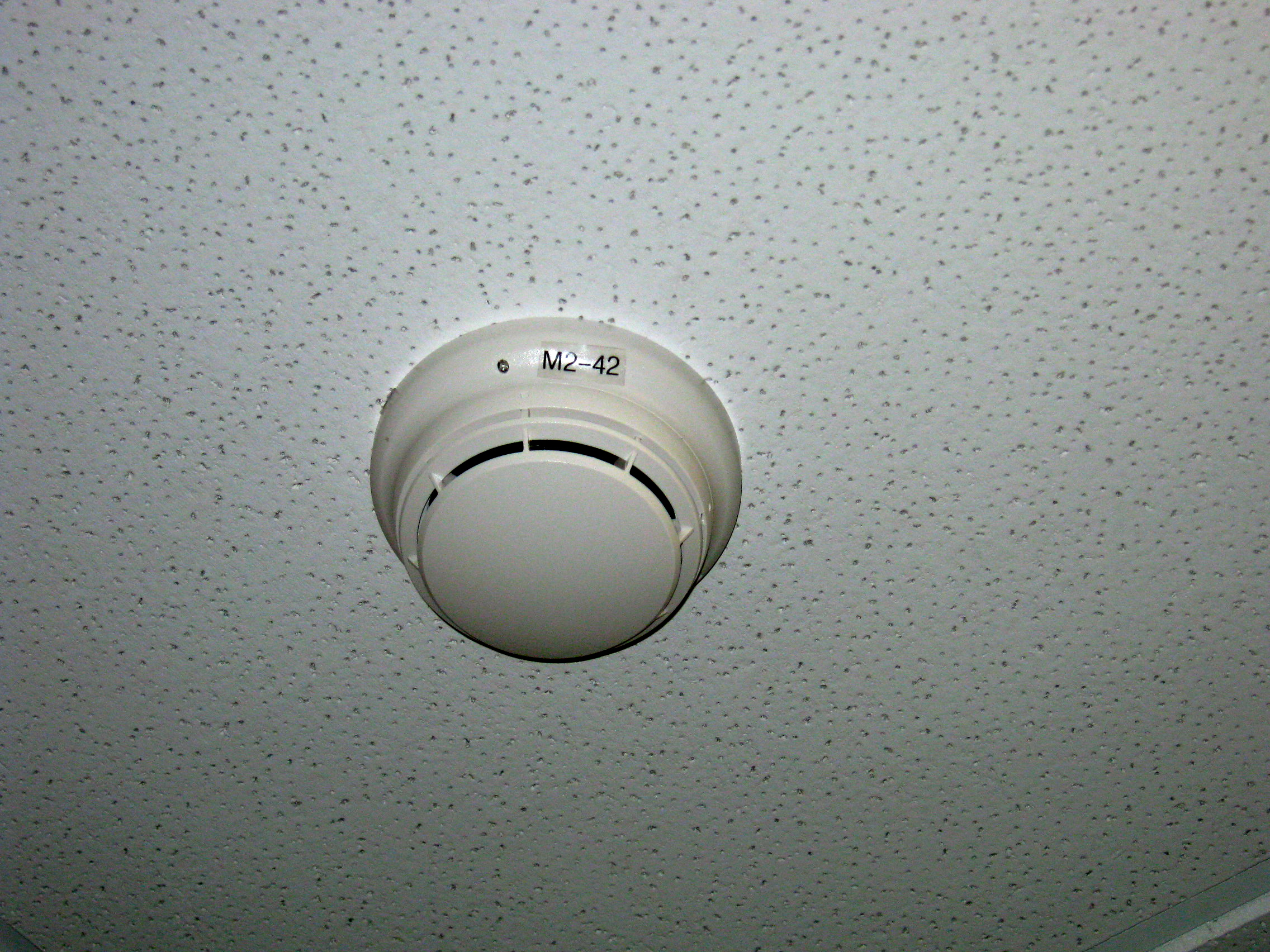
An addressable Simplex TrueAlarm smoke detector

An addressable system gives each detector an individual number or address. Addressable systems allow the exact location of an alarm to be plotted on the FACP while allowing several detectors to be connected to the same zone. In certain systems, a graphical representation of the building is provided on the screen of the FACP which shows the locations of all of the detectors in the building, while in others the address and location of the detector or detectors in alarm are simply indicated.

Addressable systems are usually more expensive than conventional non-addressable systems, and offer extra options, including a custom level of detectivity (sometimes called Day/Night mode) which can determine the amount of smoke in a given area and contamination detection from the FACP that allows determination of a wide range of faults in detection capabilities of smoke detectors. Detectors become contaminated usually as a result of the build-up of atmospheric particulates in the detectors being circulated by the heating and air-conditioning systems in buildings. Other causes include carpentry, sanding, painting, and smoke in the event of a fire. Panels can also be interconnected to monitor a large number of detectors in multiple buildings. This is most commonly used in hospitals, universities, resorts and other large centres or institutions.

== Standards ==
=== EN54 European standards ===
Fire detection products have the European Standard EN 54 Fire Detection and Fire Alarm Systems that is a mandatory standard for every product that is going to be delivered and installed in any country in the European Union (EU). EN 54 part 7 is the standard for smoke detectors. European standards are developed to allow free movement of goods in the EU countries. EN 54 is widely recognized around the world. The EN 54 certification of each device must be issued annually.

==== Coverage of smoke and temperature detectors with European standard EN54 ====
Surface area (square meters)	Type of detector	Height (m)	Ceiling slope ≤20°		Ceiling slope >20°	
Surface area (square meters)	Type of detector	Height (m)	Smax (square meters)	Rmax (m)	Smax (square meters)	Rmax(m)
SA ≤80	EN54-7	≤12	80	6,6	80	8,2
SA >80	EN54-7	≤6	60	5,7	90	8,7
SA >80		6 < h ≤ 12	80	6,6	110	9,6
SA ≤30	EN54-5 Clase A1	≤7,5	30	4,4	30	5,7
SA ≤30	EN54-5 Clase A2,B,C,D,F,G	≤ 6	30	4,4	30	5,7
SA >30	EN54-5 Clase A1	≤7,5	20	3,5	40	6,5
SA >30	EN54-5 Clase A2,B,C,D,E,F,G	≤6	20	3,5	40	6,5

- EN54-7: Smoke detector
- EN54-5: Temperature detector
- SA: Surface area
- Smax (square meters): Maximum surface coverage
- Rmax (m): Maximum radio

Information that is in bold is the standard coverage of the detector. Smoke detector coverage is 60 square meters and temperature smoke detector coverage is 20 square meters. The height from the ground is an important issue for correct protection.

An additional (harmonised) EN14604 also exists, which tends to be the standard usually cited at the domestic point of sale. This standard expands on the EN54 recommendations for domestic smoke alarms and specifies requirements, test methods, performance criteria, and manufacturer's instructions. It also includes additional requirements for smoke alarms, which are suitable for use in leisure accommodation vehicles. However, much of EN14604 is voluntary. A study published in 2014 assessed six areas of compliance and found that 33% of devices claiming to meet this standard did not do so in one or more of the specifics. The study also found 19% of the products to have a problem with actual fire detection.

=== Australia and United States ===
In the United States, the first standard for home smoke alarms was established in 1967. In 1969, the USAEC allowed homeowners to use smoke detectors without a license. The Life Safety Code (NFPA 101), passed by the US National Fire Protection Association (NFPA) in 1976, first required smoke alarms in homes. Smoke alarm detectivity requirements in UL 217 were modified in 1985 to reduce susceptibility to nuisance alarms. In 1988 BOCA, ICBO, and SBCCI model building codes begin requiring smoke alarms to be interconnected and located in all sleeping rooms. In 1989 NFPA 74 first required smoke alarms to be interconnected in every new home construction, and 1993 NFPA 72 first required that smoke alarms be installed in all bedrooms. The NFPA began requiring the replacement of smoke detectors after ten years in 1999. In 1999, the Underwriters Laboratory (UL) changed smoke alarm labeling requirements so that all smoke alarms must have a manufactured date written in plain English.

In June 2013, a World Fire Safety Foundation report titled, 'Can Australian and U.S. Smoke Alarm Standards be Trusted?' was published in the official magazine of the Australian Volunteer Firefighter Association. The report brings into question the validity of testing criteria used by American and Australian government agencies when undergoing scientific testing of ionization smoke alarms.

== Legislation ==
In June 2010 the City of Albany, California, enacted a photoelectric-only legislation after a unanimous decision by the Albany City Council; several other Californian and Ohioan cities enacted similar legislation shortly afterwards.

In November 2011, the Northern Territory enacted Australia's first residential photoelectric legislation mandating the use of photoelectric smoke alarms in all new Northern Territory homes.

From January 1, 2017, the Australian state of Queensland mandated all smoke alarms in new dwellings (or where a dwelling is substantially renovated) must be photoelectric, and not also contain an ionization detector. They also were to be hardwired to the mains power supply with a secondary power source (i.e. battery) and be interconnected with every other smoke alarm in the dwelling. This is so all would be activated together. From that date, all replacement smoke alarms must be photoelectric; from January 1, 2022, all dwellings sold, leased, or where a lease is renewed must comply as for new dwellings; and from January 1, 2027, all dwellings must comply as for new dwellings.

In June 2013, in an Australian Parliamentary speech, the question was asked, "Are ionization smoke alarms defective?" This was further to the Australian Government's scientific testing agency (the Commonwealth Scientific and Industrial Research Organisation – CSIRO) data revealing serious performance problems with ionization technology in the early, smoldering stage of a fire, a rise in litigation involving ionization smoke alarms, and increasing legislation mandating the installation of photoelectric smoke alarms. The speech cited in May 2013, World Fire Safety Foundation report published in the Australian Volunteer Firefighter Association's magazine titled, 'Can Australian and U.S. Smoke Alarm Standards be Trusted?' The speech concluded with a request for one of the world's largest ionization smoke alarm manufacturers and the CSIRO to disclose the level of visible smoke required to trigger the manufacturers' ionization smoke alarms under CSIRO scientific testing. The US state of California banned the sale of smoke detectors with replaceable batteries.

== Privacy concerns regarding smart smoke detectors ==
Smart smoke detectors, like other Internet of things devices, can collect and transmit a significant amount of data. This can include data about when and where the device is used, the frequency of alarms, and even audio and video data if the device includes a microphone or camera. This data can potentially infer sensitive information about a user's habits, routines, and lifestyle. Since smart smoke detectors are connected to the internet, they are vulnerable to hacking. An unauthorized person could potentially access the device and the data it collects. In extreme cases, if the device includes a camera or microphone, a hacker could use it to spy on the home's inhabitants.

Many smart device manufacturers share user data with third parties, often for advertising or data analysis purposes. This can be a significant privacy concern if the data includes sensitive or personally identifiable information. Some manufacturers may also cooperate with law enforcement agencies, potentially providing them with access to users' data without their knowledge or consent.

Many users have taken steps to protect their privacy when using smart smoke detectors. This can include using strong, unique passwords for their devices, disabling unnecessary features, and regularly updating device software to protect against security vulnerabilities. Some users may also choose to use traditional smoke detectors that do not connect to the internet, to completely avoid these privacy concerns.
