= Gent =

Gent is a shortened form of the word gentleman. It may also refer to:

- Ghent (officially written Gent, in Dutch), a Belgian city
  - K.A.A. Gent, a football club from Ghent
  - K.R.C. Gent, a football club from Ghent
  - Gent RFC, a rugby club in Ghent
  - .gent, a GeoTLD (top-level domain) for the city of Ghent
- Gent (hyperelastic model), rubber elasticity model
- Gent Cakaj (born 1990), Albanian politician
- Gent Strazimiri (born 1972), Albanian politician
- Gent (surname)
- Gent (magazine), a defunct pornographic magazine
- Honeywell Gent, a brand of fire alarm systems previously known as Gents' of Leicester

== See also ==
- Gents (disambiguation)
- Van Gent (disambiguation)
- Gente (disambiguation)
- Ghent (disambiguation)
- Gentleman (disambiguation)
- Gentlewoman (disambiguation)
- Lady (disambiguation)
