= Van Gendt =

Van Gendt is a Dutch toponymic surname indicating an origin in the town Gendt, Gelderland. People with this name include:

- Dirk-Jan van Gendt (born 1974), Dutch volleyball player
- Dolf van Gendt (1835–1901), Dutch architect
- Twan van Gendt (born 1992), Dutch racing cyclist
- Willem Eggert van Gendt (1360–1417), Amsterdam noble, banker and magistrate

== See also ==
- Van Gent, Dutch-language surname referring to Ghent
- Van Gend & Loos, Dutch distribution company established by Jan-Baptist van Gend (1772–1831)
- Gazette van Ghendt, 18th-century newspaper in Ghent
