= Gent (surname) =

Gent may refer to:

- Alan Neville Gent (1927–2012), English physicist
- Billy Gent (1879–1957), Australian rules footballer
- Chris Gent (born 1948), British businessman
- Don Gent (1933–1996), Australian rules footballer
- Edward Gent (1895–1948), British colony administrator
- Georgie Gent (born 1988), English tennis player
- Ian Gent, British computer scientist
- John Thomas Gent, British clock maker
- Keith Gent (born 1945), Australian rules footballer
- Mike Gent (born 1971), American musician
- Peter Gent (1942–2011), American writer and football player
- Robert Gent-Davis (1857–1903), English businessman and politician
- Thomas Gent (1693–1778), printer and author

== See also ==
- Van Gent (disambiguation)
