= Gentleman (disambiguation) =

A gentleman is a man of good quality.

Gentleman or gentlemen may also refer to:

== People ==
=== Nickname or stagename ===
- Gentleman Reg, stage name of Reg Vermue, a Canadian indie rock singer
- Henry Simms (1717–1747), aka "Young Gentleman Harry", an English thief and highwayman
- Chris Adams (wrestler) (1955–2001), nicknamed "Gentleman", English professional wrestler and model
- Gentleman John, a list of people with this nickname
- William 'Gentleman' Smith (1730–1819), actor
- Andrés Escobar, nicknamed "The Gentleman"
- Gentleman Jim (disambiguation), including a list of people with the nickname, the best known being:
  - James J. Corbett (1866–1933), boxing champion
- The Gentleman of Heligoland, unidentified body found in 1994 off the shore of Heligoland (Germany)

=== Surname ===
- Allan Gentleman, Scottish swimmer
- Amelia Gentleman, British journalist, daughter of David
- David Gentleman (born 1930), English artist and stamp designer
- Jane Forer Gentleman, American-Canadian statistician
- Julia Gentleman (1931–2023), American politician
- Mick Gentleman (born 1955), Australian politician
- Robert Gentleman (water polo) (1923–2005), British water polo player
- Robert Gentleman (statistician), Canadian statistician and bioinformatician
- Tobias Gentleman (fl. 1614), English mariner and writer
- Tom Gentleman, Scottish painter and artist, father of David
- W. Morven Gentleman (1942–2018), Canadian computer scientist

=== Fictional characters ===
- The Gentlemen, a group of demons in the Buffy the Vampire Slayer TV episode "Hush"
- Gentleman (character), a fictional Marvel Comics villain
- Mr. Gentleman, a character in some novels by Edna O'Brien

== Film and TV ==
- A Gentleman, a 2017 Bollywood film
- Gentleman (1989 film), an Indian Hindi-language film
- Gentleman (1993 film), an Indian Tamil-language film
- The Gentlemen (1965 film), a 1965 West German comedy drama film
- The Gentleman (1994 film), an Indian Hindi-language film
- Gentlemen (2014 film), a Swedish film based on the novel by Östergren
- Gentleman (2016 film), an Indian Telugu-language film directed by Mohan Krishna Indraganti starring Nani and Surabhi
- The Gentlemen (2019 film), an action comedy directed by Guy Ritchie
- Gentleman (2020 film), an Indian Kannada-language film
- Galantuomini or Gentlemen, a 2008 Italian film
- The Gentlemen (2016 TV series), a Singaporean drama series
- Gentleman (2022 film), a South Korean film
- The Gentlemen (2024 TV series), a British-American crime-drama series created by Guy Ritchie

== Books ==
- Gentleman (magazine), an English language literary magazine published in India from 1980 to 2001
- Gentlemen (novel), a 1980 novel by Klas Östergren
- The Gentleman's Magazine, published in England from the 18th century until 1922
- The Gentleman (magazine) (1713–1714) a short-lived sequel to The Guardian

== Music ==
- The Gentlemen (Seattle band), an American rock band from 1998 to 2001
- The Gentlemen (Dallas band), an American garage rock band from 1964 to 1968
- Gentleman (musician) (born 1975), stage name of German reggae musician Tilmann Otto

=== Albums ===
- Gentleman (Fela Kuti album), 1973
- Gentlemen (Hair Peace Salon album), 2012
- Gentle Men, a 1997 album by Roy Bailey and Robb Johnson
- Gentlemen (album), a 1993 album by The Afghan Whigs
- Gentleman (EP), a 2015 EP by Joker Xue
- Gentleman (Budjerah album), 2026

=== Songs ===
- "Gentleman", song from Paradise (Cody Simpson album)
- "Gentleman" (Lou Bega song), 2001
- "Gentleman" (Psy song), 2013
- "Gentleman" (The Saturdays song), 2013
- "Gentleman", song by SL (rapper), 2017
- "Gentleman", song from The Truth Is... (Theory of a Deadman album)
- "Gentleman", song from Born to Be XX

== Sports ==
- Gentlemen (horse), an Argentinian Thoroughbred racehorse
- Gentlemen cricket team (1806–1962), an English cricket team
- the male sports teams of Centenary College of Louisiana

== See also ==
- Southern gentleman
- Gentlelady
- Gentlewoman (disambiguation)
