= Gents =

Gents may refer to:

- (Men's) washroom, toilet, loo, bathroom, little boys room, . . .
- Gents (novel), a 1997 novel by Warwick Collins
- The Gents (American band), led by Willie Kent
- The Gents (British band), from Doncaster, a mod revival band
- The Gents (Dutch vocal group), a classical music ensemble led by Peter Dijkstra
- The Gents (British jazz band), from Swansea, with member Steve Augarde
- The Gents (Bermuda rock band), a rock band active in the 1960s

== See also ==
- Gent (disambiguation)
- Gentleman (disambiguation)
- Gentlewoman (disambiguation)
- Lady (disambiguation)
