= Jent =

Jent is a surname. Notable people with the surname include:

- Chris Jent (born 1970), American basketball player and coach
- Franz Louis Jent, founder of the German-language newspaper Der Bund
- Larry Jent, American politician

== See also ==
- Gent
- Jents, surname
