= Ghent (disambiguation) =

Ghent (officially written Gent in Dutch), is a city in Belgium.

Ghent may also refer to:

== Places ==
United States

- Ghent, Kentucky
- Ghent, Minnesota
- Ghent (CDP), New York
- Ghent, New York
  - Ghent (NYCRR station), a former railway station in the New York town of the same name
- Ghent, Ohio
- Ghent (Norfolk), Virginia
- Ghent, West Virginia

== Other uses ==
- Ghent (surname)
- K.A.A. Gent, a Belgian football club in Ghent
- Treaty of Ghent

== See also ==
- Gent (disambiguation)
- Gente (disambiguation)
