= Robert Gentleman =

Robert Gentleman may refer to:

- Robert Gentleman (water polo)
- Robert Gentleman (statistician)
