= Van Gent =

Van Gent is a Dutch toponymic surname indicating an origin in the city Ghent, East Flanders. A variant spelling is Van Ghent. People with this name include:

- Eugene Van Gent (1889–1949), American college football and basketball coach
- Hendrik van Gent (c.1217–1293), Flemish theologian
- Hendrik van Gent (1899–1947), Dutch astronomer
  - Van Gent (crater), lunar crater named for the astronomer
  - 1666 van Gent, asteroid discovered by Hendrik van Gent
- Henk van Gent (born 1951), Dutch competitive sailor
- Ineke van Gent (born 1957), Dutch GreenLeft politician
- Jan van Gent (1340–1399), Dutch name of John of Gaunt, 1st Duke of Lancaster, born in Ghent
- Joris van Gent (fl. 1552–1577) or Joris van Straeten, a Flemish portrait and history painter from Ghent
- Justus van Gent or Joos van Ghent (c.1410–1480), Early Netherlandish painter
- Maarten van Gent (1947–2025), Dutch basketball coach, scout and businessman
- Olivier van Ghent (c.1470–1512), Flemish sculptor active in Portugal
- Pieter van Gent (c.1480–1572), Flemish missionary in Mexico known there as Pedro de Gante
- Willem Joseph van Ghent (1626–1672), Dutch admiral

== See also ==
- Van Gendt, Dutch surname referring to Gendt, Gelderland
- Jan-van-gent, Dutch name for the Northern gannet
- Sas van Gent, town in the Dutch province of Zeeland on the border with Belgium
- Van Gend & Loos, Dutch distribution company established by Jan-Baptist van Gend (1772–1831)
- Gazette van Ghendt, 18th-century newspaper in Ghent
- HNLMS Van Ghent (1926), Royal Netherlands Navy destroyer named after Willem Joseph van Ghent
