= Jents =

Jents is a surname. Notable people with the surname include:

- Beril Jents (1918–2013), Australian fashion designer
- Kalle Jents (born 1957), Estonian politician

== See also ==
- Jent, surname
