= Gente =

Gente may refer to:

- Gente (magazine), an Italian magazine
- "Gente" (song), a song by Laura Pausini
- Partido de la Gente, a Uruguayan political party, established 2016
- Gente y la actualidad, an Argentine magazine
- Genté, a commune in France
- La Gente de Aztlan, a UCLA newspaper
- "La gente", a poem by Trilussa

== See also ==
- Ghent (disambiguation)
- Gent (disambiguation)
