= Keith Gent =

Australian rules footballer

Personal information
- Full name: Keith E. Gent
- Born: 13 April 1945 (age 81)
- Original team: Essendon Baptists-St John's
- Height: 182 cm (6 ft 0 in)
- Weight: 75 kg (165 lb)
- Position: Half-forward

Playing career^{1}
Years	Club	Games (Goals)
1965–66	Essendon	7 (0)
- ^{1} Playing statistics correct to the end of 1966.

Keith Gent (born 13 April 1945) is a former Australian rules footballer who played with Essendon in the Victorian Football League (VFL). He played for Essendon's under-19s in 1964, winning the club best and fairest as well as representing Victoria. Gent served in the Vietnam War in 1967 and 1968 where he was wounded. He returned to Australia in 1969 and played with Essendon's reserves before transferring to Victorian Football Association (VFA) side, Preston. Gent then spent three seasons with fellow VFA club Brunswick before he became captain-coach of Reservoir where his team won consecutive premierships in 1975 and 1976. He later returned to VFL football as a coach – he was a coach of Essendon's under-19s and also an assistant coach of Fitzroy's under-19s.
