= Gentleman Jim =

Gentleman Jim may refer to:

== Nickname ==
- Jim Brough (1903–1986), English rugby union, and rugby league footballer, and coach
- Jim Cleary (Australian footballer) (1914–1993), Australian rules footballer
- James J. Corbett (1866–1933), American world heavyweight boxing champion
- Jimmy Dickinson (1925–1982), English footballer
- Jim Fanning (1927–2015), American-Canadian Major League Baseball player, manager and executive
- Jim Kramer (born 1958), champion Scrabble player
- Jim Langley (1929–2007), English footballer
- Jimmy Lewthwaite (1920–2006), English rugby union, and rugby league footballer
- Jim Leytham (1879–1916), English rugby league footballer
- Jim Lonborg (born 1942), American retired Major League Baseball pitcher
- Jim Manson (Australian footballer) (died 2010), Australian rules footballer and politician
- Jim McKeever (born 1930), Irish former Gaelic footballer
- Jim Reeves (1923–1964), American country and popular music singer
- Gentleman Jim Robinson (1799–1875), African-American entrepreneur
- Jim Snyder (coach) (1919–1994), American college basketball head coach
- Jim Thome (born 1970), American retired Major League Baseball player
- James K. Woolnough (1910–1996), U.S. Army general
- James J. Yeager, American college football player and head coach

== Other uses ==
- Gentleman Jim (film), a 1942 film starring Errol Flynn as the boxer James J. Corbett
- Gentleman Jim, an 1878 publication of Elizabeth Prentiss
- Gentleman Jim, a 1980 book by children's author Raymond Briggs
- "Gentleman Jim", an episode of the animated children's show Tracey McBean
- Ch. Gentleman Jim, one of the first champion Staffordshire Bull Terriers
- Gentleman Ghost, a supervillain in DC Comics
