= Gent RFC =

Gent Rugby Football Club
- Founded: 1969
- Location: Ghent, Belgium
- Chairman: Pieter Coucke
- Coach: Michel Bruyère
Team kit

Gent RFC is a Belgian rugby club in Ghent. Former IOC president Jacques Rogge was a founding member of the club.

== History ==
The club was founded in 1969 by Jacques Rogge, his brother Philippe Rogge, Pierre Saverys, Jan Standaert and Guy Callebaut. They were all former ASUB Rugby players who found it increasingly hard to travel from Ghent to Brussels, where the aforementioned club was based at the time.
