= Ghent (surname) =

Ghent is a surname. Notable people with the surname include:

- Emma Ghent Curtis (1860–1918), American novelist, poet, newspaper publisher, Populist, and suffragist
- Emmanuel Ghent (1925–2003), Canadian composer and psychoanalyst
- Matthew Ghent (born 1980), English footballer
- Ronnie Ghent (born 1980), American football player and coach
- W. J. Ghent (1866–1942), American writer
