= Gentlewoman (disambiguation) =

Gentlewoman is a courtesy name and social rank.

Gentlewoman or variant, may also refer to:

- A Gentle Woman (film), a 1969 French film
- The Gentlewoman (periodical), a weekly newspaper founded in London in 1890
- The Gentlewoman (magazine), a biannual magazine founded in 2010

== See also ==
- Chief Gentlewoman of the Privy Chamber
- Gentlewoman of the Privy Chamber, see Lady of the Bedchamber
- Gentlelady
- Gent (disambiguation)
- Lady (disambiguation)
- Woman (disambiguation)
- Women (disambiguation)
- Gentle (disambiguation)
- Gentleman (disambiguation)
