= Gentleman John =

Wikimedia disambiguation page

Gentleman John, Gentleman Johnny, or Gentleman Jonathan may refer to:

Gentleman John:

- Johnny Enzmann (1890–1984), American Major League Baseball pitcher
- John Harris (footballer) (1917–1988), Scottish footballer
- John Jackson (English boxer) (1769–1845), English boxer
- John Palmer (actor) (1742?–1798), English actor
- John L. Rotz (1934–2021), American jockey
- John Sattler (born 1942), Australian rugby league footballer of the 1960s and 1970s

Gentleman Johnny:

- John Burgoyne (1722–1792), British Army general in the American Revolutionary War
- Johnny Ramensky (1905–1972), Scottish career criminal and Second World War British Army commando

Gentleman Jonathan

- "Gentleman" Jonathan Sayers, a professional wrestling manager from All- Star Wrestling

Fictional characters:

- "Gentleman" Johnny Marcone; see List of The Dresden Files characters
