= Allan Gentleman =

Allan Forbes Gentleman is a former member of the Scottish National Swimming Team and a five-time World Masters Swimming Champion (Aarhus, August 1989). He is also a writer and actor, and has worked in the British television and film industry since 1998.

His father, Robert Forbes Gentleman (born 28 August 1923), was a British water polo player who competed in the 1948 Summer Olympics.
