= Gazette van Ghendt =

Newspaper

- 14 December 1815 edition
- Founder(s): F. and D. vander Ween
- Founded: 1723
- Ceased publication: 1940
- Language: Dutch 1723–1809 and 1814–1940; French 1809–1814
- City: Ghent
- Country: Belgium

The Gazette van Gent was a twice-weekly newspaper originally published in Ghent from 1723 to 1809 under the title Gazette van Ghendt. The publisher switched to French in 1809, first under the title Gazette de Gand and from 1811 as Journal du département de l'Escaut. Dutch-language publication resumed in 1814, initially under the title Gazette van Gend, and continued until 1940, with a hiatus during the First World War.

== Publication history ==
The first owners were F. and D. vander Ween (1723), with Dominicus vander Ween taking over sole proprietorship in 1734. In 1748 ownership was acquired by Petrus Joannes Vereecken, who transferred it to Michiel de Goesin in 1749. From 1761 the publisher was Jan Meyer, succeeded by his widow and heirs in 1771, and then his son, Jan Meyer. In 1794 J. F. Vander Schueren acquired ownership from Jan Meyer's widow. He was succeeded by F. J. Bogaert in 1804. Bogaert switched publication to French in 1809, then back to Dutch in 1814. Around 1830 the newspaper was acquired by the Vanderhaeghen-Hulin family, who continued to publish it until 1940.

== Licensing ==
Originally licensed by the imperial authorities of the Austrian Netherlands, from 1789 to 1790 the licensing body was first the United States of Belgium and then the States of Flanders. During the French occupation (1794 onwards) the Departmental Prefect controlled publication. The newspaper bore the motto Vryheyd, Gelykheyd, Onpartydigheyd (Liberty, Equality, Impartiality) from 1794 to 1801.
