= Van Gend & Loos =

Former Dutch distribution company

N.V. Expeditie Onderneming Van Gend & Loos
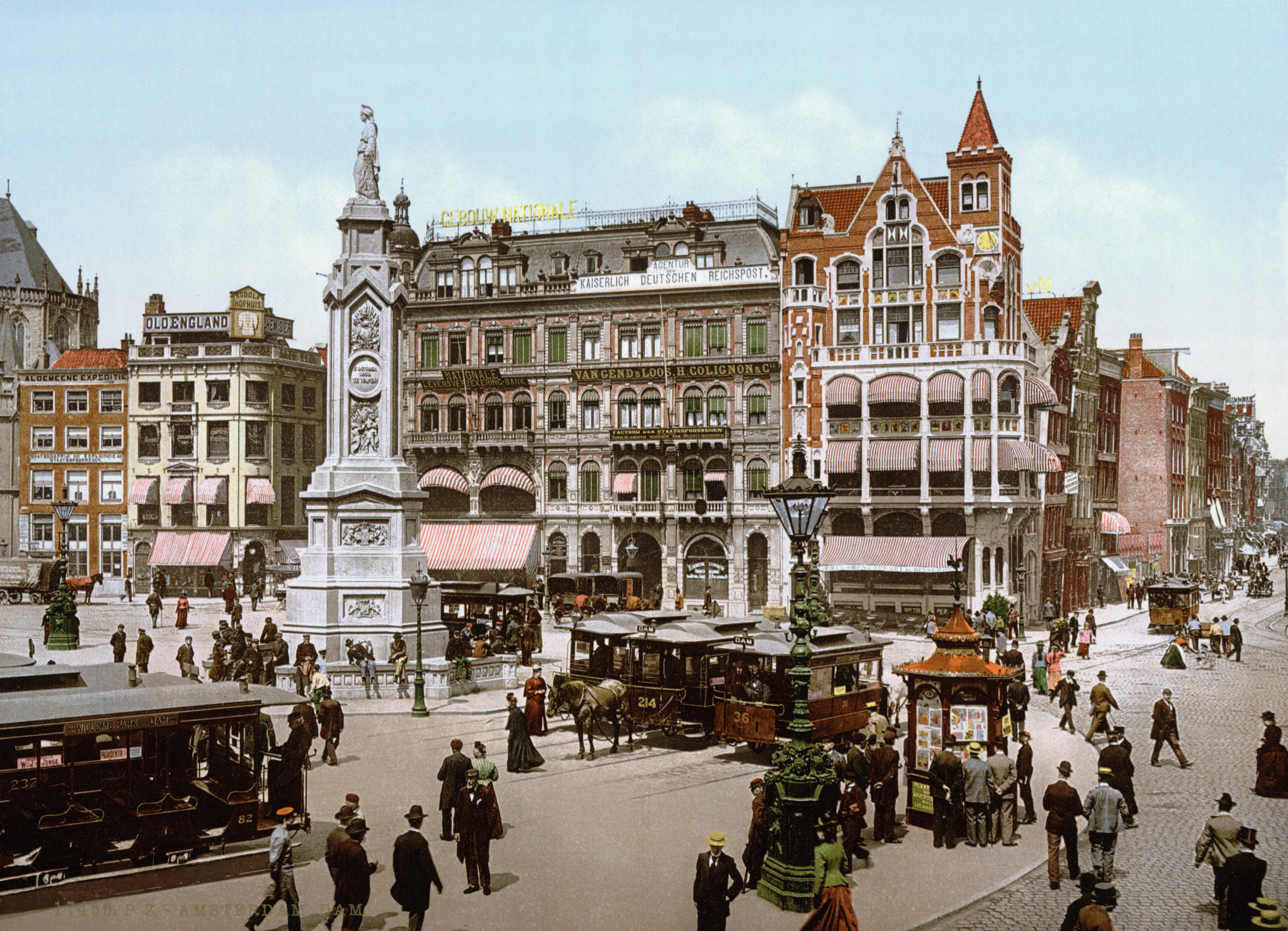
- Van Gend & Loos on Dam Square, Amsterdam, c. 1890–1900
- Formerly: De Algemeene Postwagen Onderneming J.B. van Gend & Loos
- Type: Subsidiary
- Industry: Passenger transport; Break bulk cargo transport; Freight transport
- Founded: 1809; 217 years ago
- Founder: Jan-Baptist van Gend
- Defunct: 2003
- Fate: Merged with Deutsche Post subsidiaries Danzas and DHL Worldwide Express to form DHL
- Headquarters: Utrecht, Netherlands
- Parent: Dutch national railroad (1928–1986); Nedlloyd (1986–1999); Deutsche Post (1999–2003)

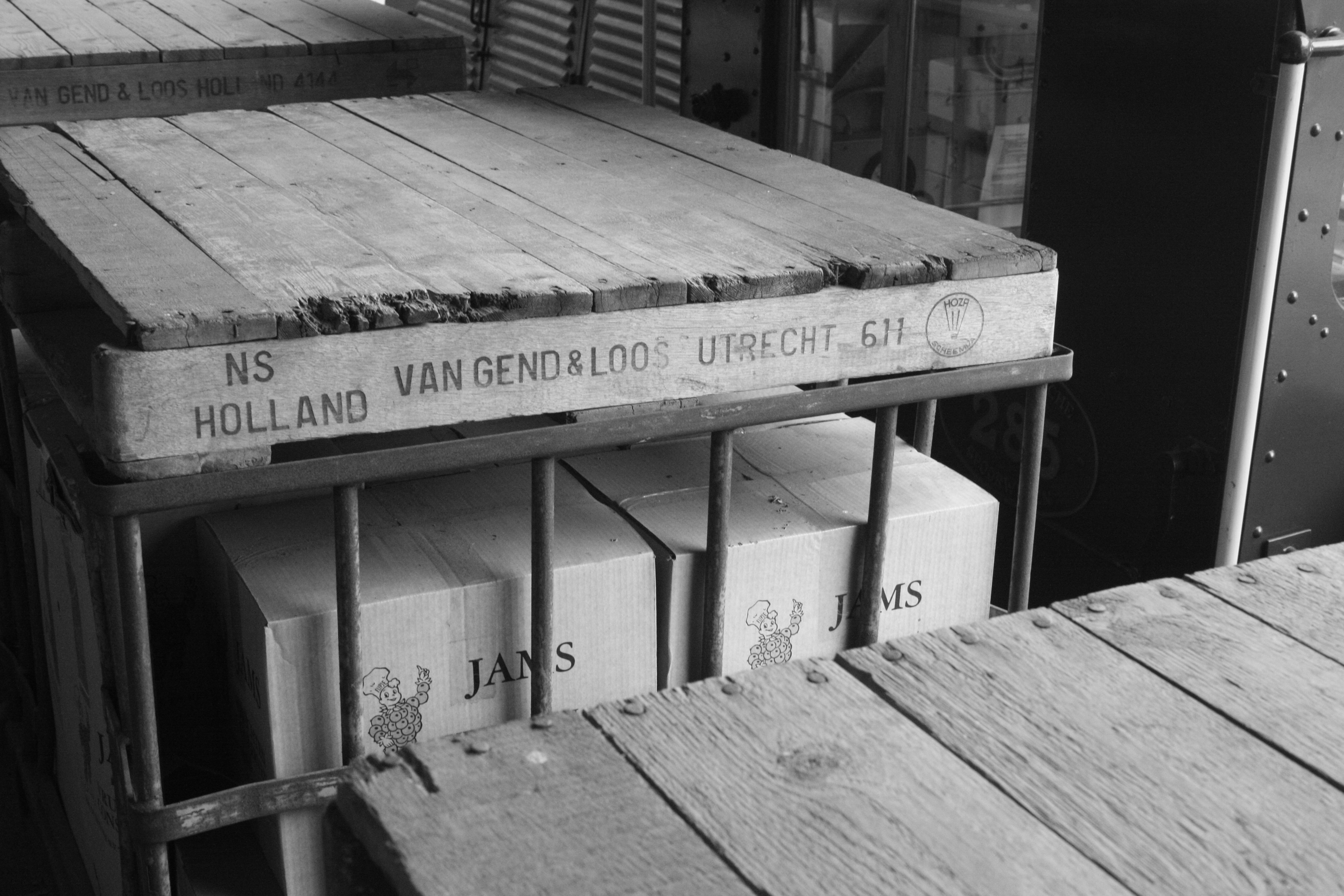
Early 20th century Van Gend & Loos crates for rail transport, Arnhem Open Air Museum

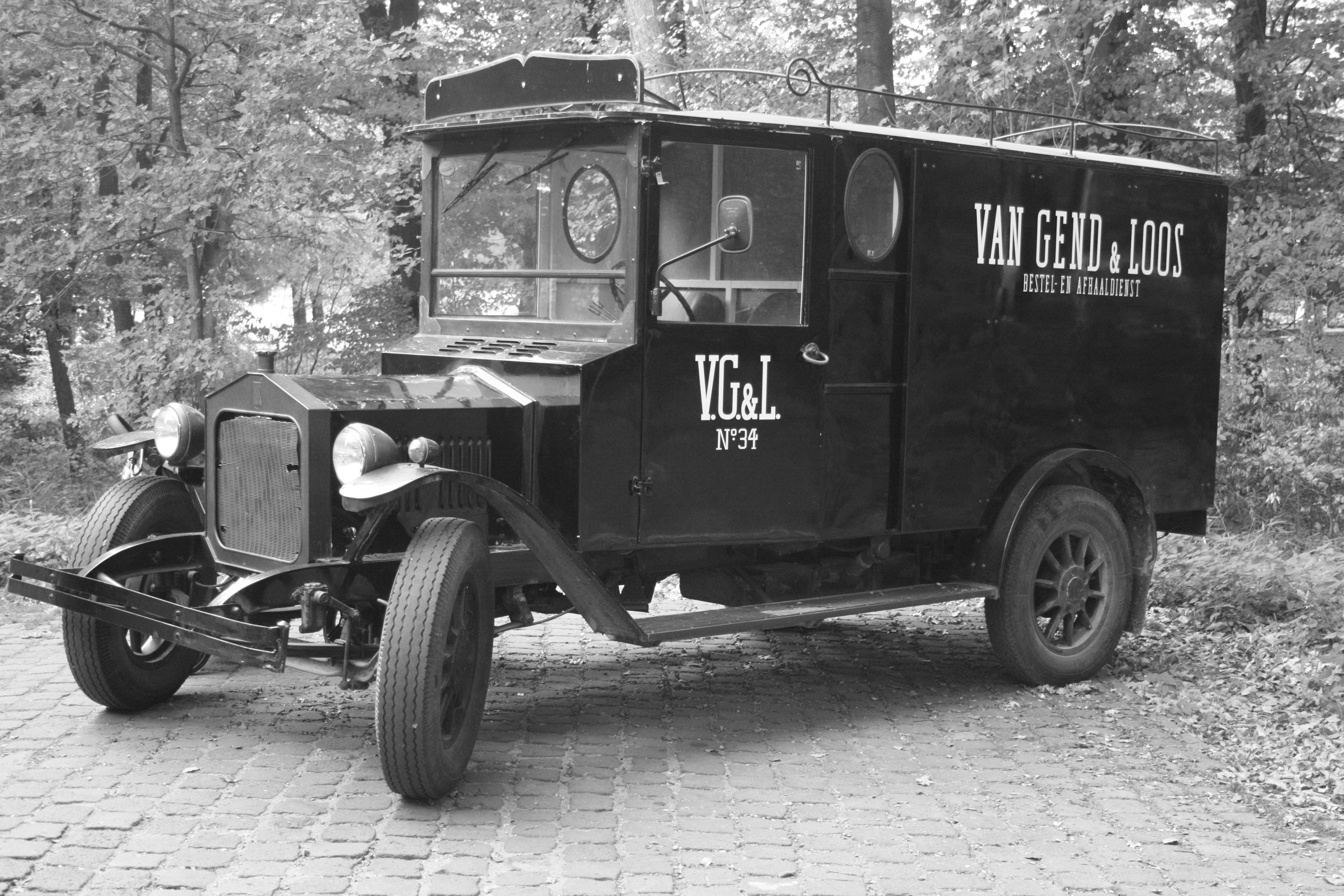
An early 20th century Van Gend & Loos delivery truck

Van Gend & Loos was a Dutch distribution company. It was established in 1809, and was purchased by DHL in 2003.

== History ==
Van Gend & Loos was established by the Antwerp-based innkeeper and carriage driver Jan-Baptist van Gend. He had married a woman from the Loos family in 1796. When Van Gend's brother-in-law Petrus Josephus Loos died in 1809, his diligence company was merged with Van Gend's company to form Van Gend & Loos.

The De Algemeene Postwagen Onderneming J.B. van Gend & Loos (General Postal Carriage Company J.B. van Gend & Loos) gradually expanded its network of diligence services, to transport passengers, goods and money. The company remained active in the Low Countries (and beyond) when Belgium became independent from the Netherlands in 1830.

Van Gend & Loos had trouble keeping up with competition from rail transport. Diligence services between places that also had a railway connection, had to be abandoned. Van Gend & Loos did offer a connection to places where a railway hadn't yet been constructed, but the number of such places declined with the expansion of the railway system. Disestablishment of the company was even considered in the 19th century.

Van Gend & Loos was purchased by employee Hipolyte Colignon, who revitalised the company. He abandoned passenger transport, and focussed on the transport of break bulk cargo from and to railway stations. To this end, he signed deals with railway companies.

Railway companies in their turn had trouble keeping up with the competition from motorised traffic, particularly trucks, vans and buses, in the 1920s. The national railroad company established the Algemeene Transport Onderneming (ATO; General Transport Company), which used both buses and trucks. The ATO was intended to transport break bulk cargo from and to the railway stations, which had been Van Gend & Loos' market. In 1928, the national railway company took over Van Gend & Loos. The N.V. Expeditie Onderneming Van Gend & Loos switched to trucks, and grew significantly.

Important railway stations had large warehouses, with freight wagons on one side, and grey and orange Van Gend & Loos trucks and vans on the other side. The corporate headquarters were moved to Utrecht in 1960, near the headquarters of the Nederlandse Spoorwegen, the Dutch railway company.

Van Gend en Loos v Nederlandse Administratie der Belastingen (1963) was a case that gave Van Gend en Loos a place in the history of European Union law.

== Takeover ==
The company was reorganised in 1984. Railway transport of break bulk cargo was abandoned, and the company focussed on transport by truck. Van Gend & Loos was sold to Nedlloyd in 1986, with its main focus becoming the transport of packages and pallets within the Benelux area.

Nedlloyd sold Van Gend & Loos to Deutsche Post (DP) in 1999. The three daughter companies of DP (Danzas, DHL Worldwide Express and Van Gend & Loos) were merged to form DHL in 2003, ending the almost 200-year history of Van Gend & Loos.

== See also ==
- Postal history
