= Robert Gentleman (water polo) =

British water polo player

Personal information
- Born: August 28, 1923; Motherwell, Scotland
- Died: October 21, 2005 (aged 82); Chester, England

Sport
- Sport: Water polo

Robert Forbes Gentleman (28 August 1923 – 21 October 2005) was a British water polo player who competed in the 1948 Summer Olympics. He was part of the British team which was eliminated in the first round of the 1948 tournament. He played both matches. His son Allan Gentleman was five times World Masters Swimming Champion.
