= Honeywell Gent =

British manufacturer of life safety equipment

- Type: Subsidiary
- Industry: Life Safety Systems
- Founder: John T. Gent
- Headquarters: Leicester, United Kingdom
- Parent: Honeywell
- Website: https://buildings.honeywell.com/gb/en/brands/our-brands/gent

Honeywell Gent, formerly Gents' of Leicester, is a British manufacturer of life safety equipment based in Leicester, England. Established by John Thomas Gent, the company is thought to have started in 1872 however it could have been trading as early as the 1860s. The company had a workforce of several hundred at its height.

For over a century, the company was a well-known manufacturer of electrical equipment, in particular its electric clocks, which were used in public buildings and railway stations all over the world. Since the late 20th century, the company's primary focus has been fire detection and alarm systems.

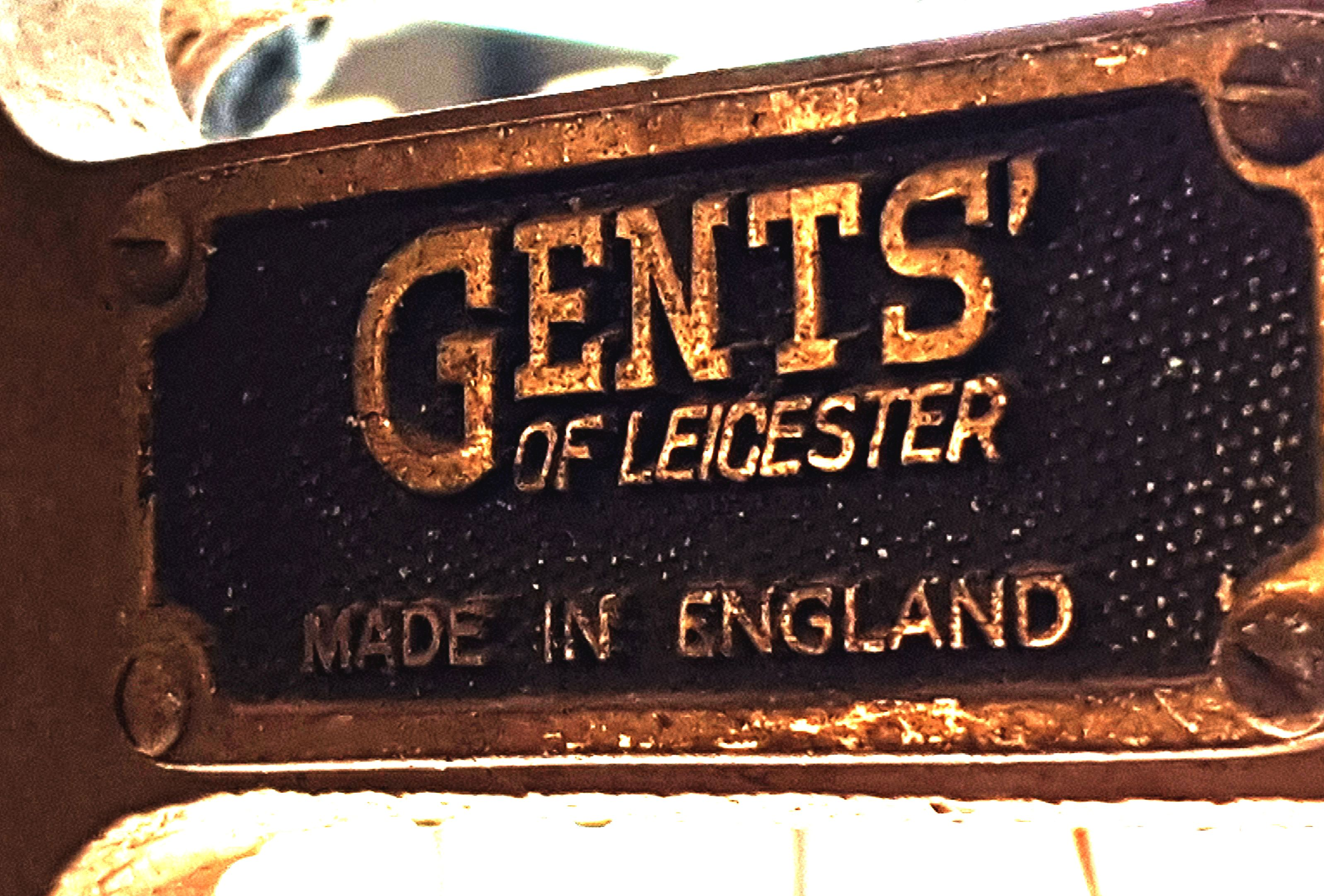
Former Gents' of Leicester logo.

== Products ==
=== Early years ===
During the early years of the company, John T. Gent and Company manufactured both electric and pneumatic bells and other indicating equipment. By 1888, the company had a sizeable catalogue of electrical and mechanical products as well as products intended for the generation and storage of electricity. Gent also manufactured cables however this would be brought to an end in 1914.

=== Early 20th Century ===
In 1914, the Midland Electric Wire Manufacturing Company ceased trading, bringing an end to the manufacturing of cables at the Faraday Works factory on St Saviours Rd. The reclaimed factory space was used to further grow the business. By the 1930s, Gent were manufacturing bells, clocks, power supplies, fire alarm systems, telephones and signalling and recording equipment. The company also produced sirens as wells as electrical parts for aircraft communications and radar equipment. Trading as Gents' of Leicester by the 1940s, the company owned showrooms to demonstrate its products. Gent also made air raid sirens, particularly the Tanhent series, during World War II.

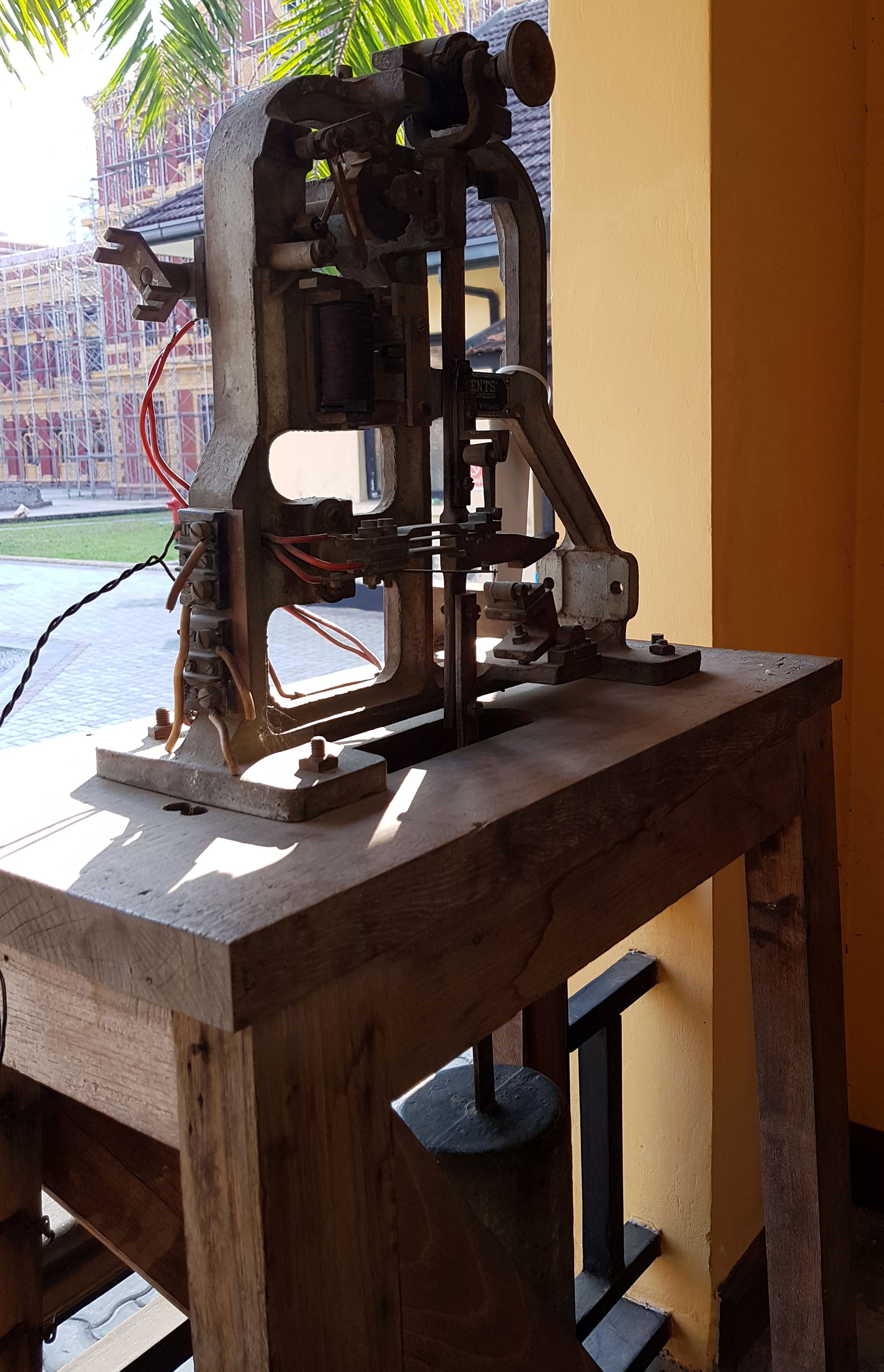
Gents' Pulsynetic, C40A, Waiting Train, Turret Clock (1940s/50?). Photographed in the Ministers' Building (The Secretariat), Yangon.

=== Mid-to-late 20th century ===
Some of Gent's most recognisable products were produced during the mid to late 20th Century. The company continued making electric bells and, trading as Chloride Gent following the acquisition, released the Chloride Gent Warbler – one of the first electronic fire alarm sounders. The Warblers were extremely loud and were used in many schools across the United Kingdom. The original Warbler has three selectable tones: warble, continuous and intermittent. It had adjustable pitch and speed dials. Later models such as the Model 3500 Warbler were considerably quieter, lacked speed and pitch controls and included an additional tone: the sweep tone. Due to the success of the Warblers, other companies started manufacturing similar electronic sounders such as Protec's SR2. In recent years, the Warblers have become valuable collector's items due to their increasing scarcity.

Chloride Gent's other popular products included the Model 1102 Manual Call Point, which could be fitted with an optional hammer attached to a chain. Model 1102 call points could be used on AC or DC fire alarm systems. Gent continued making sirens such as the Model 1500, often used in large open areas or industrial spaces. The model 1500 sounded very similar to air raid sirens.

Following the acquisition by the MK Electric Group, Gent (now Gent Limited), continued producing life safety equipment. The 1980s saw the introduction of new electronic sounders (the Model 2511 and 2510) which were manufactured until 2003. The company also introduced the 1195 Manual Call Point, distinguishable by its square design as opposed to the rectangular design of the Model 1102.

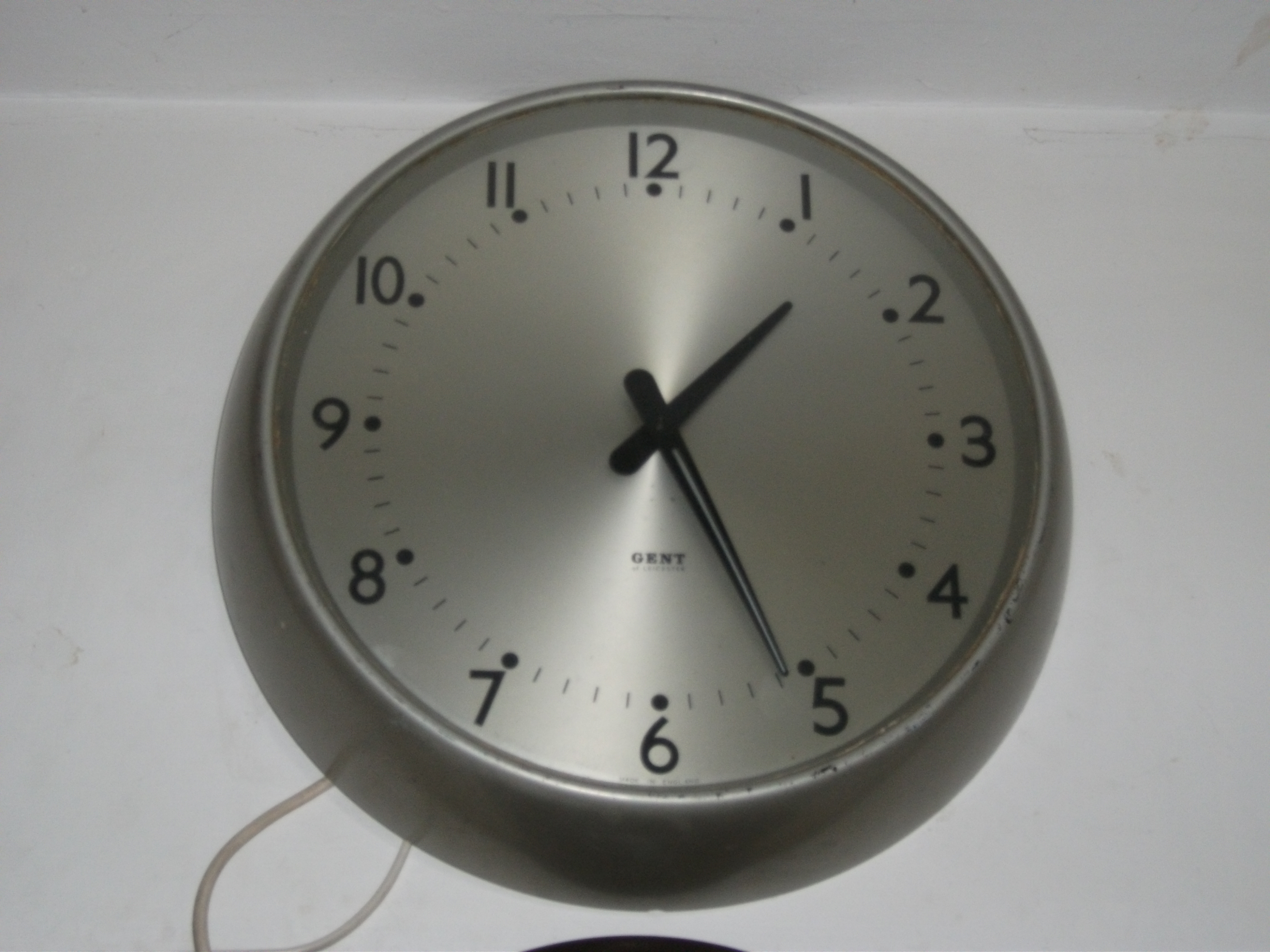
A typical 240-volt electric wall clock produced by Gents' of Leicester, dating to approx. the late 1960s.

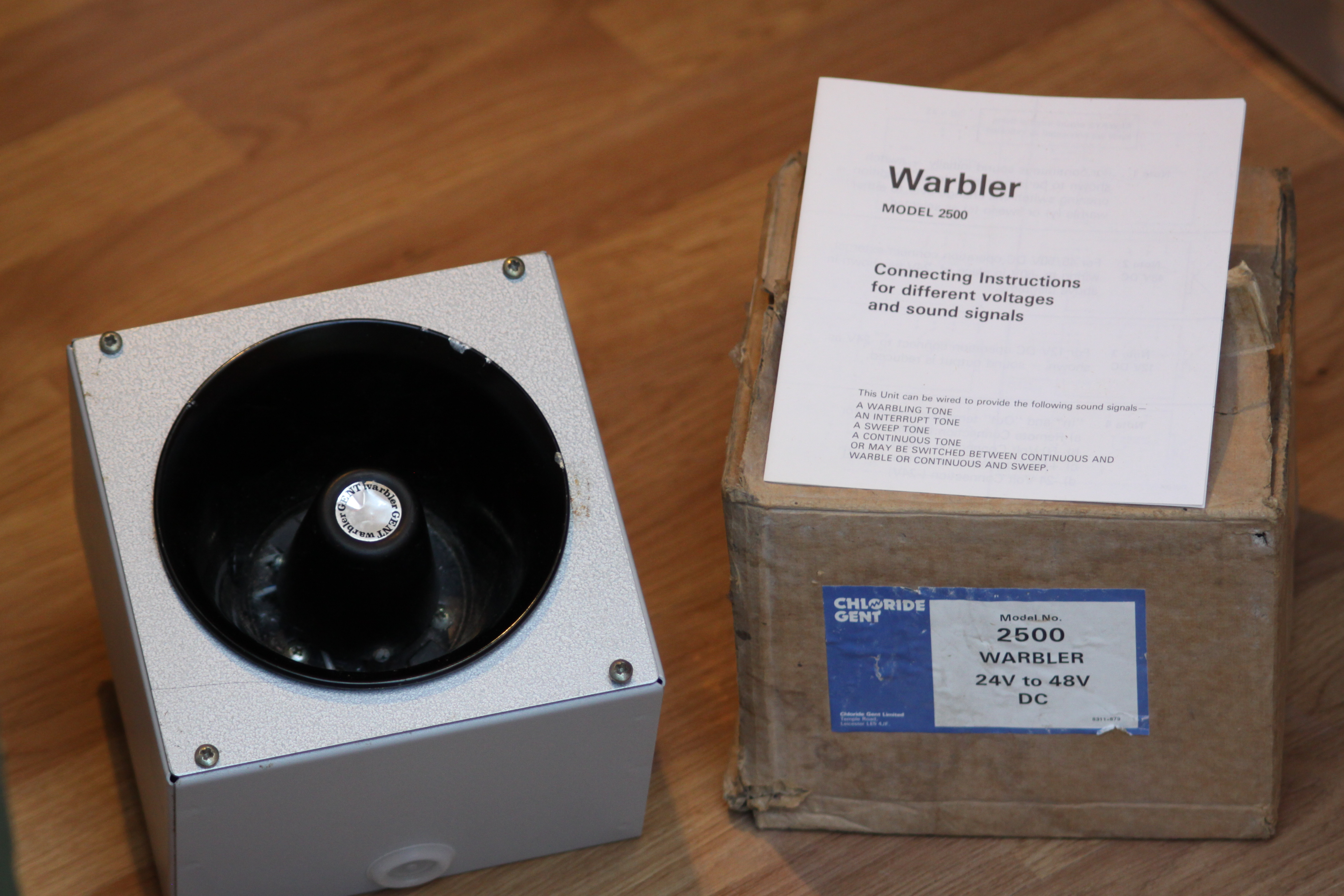
A later Model 2500 Chloride Gent Warbler, complete with instruction manual and box.

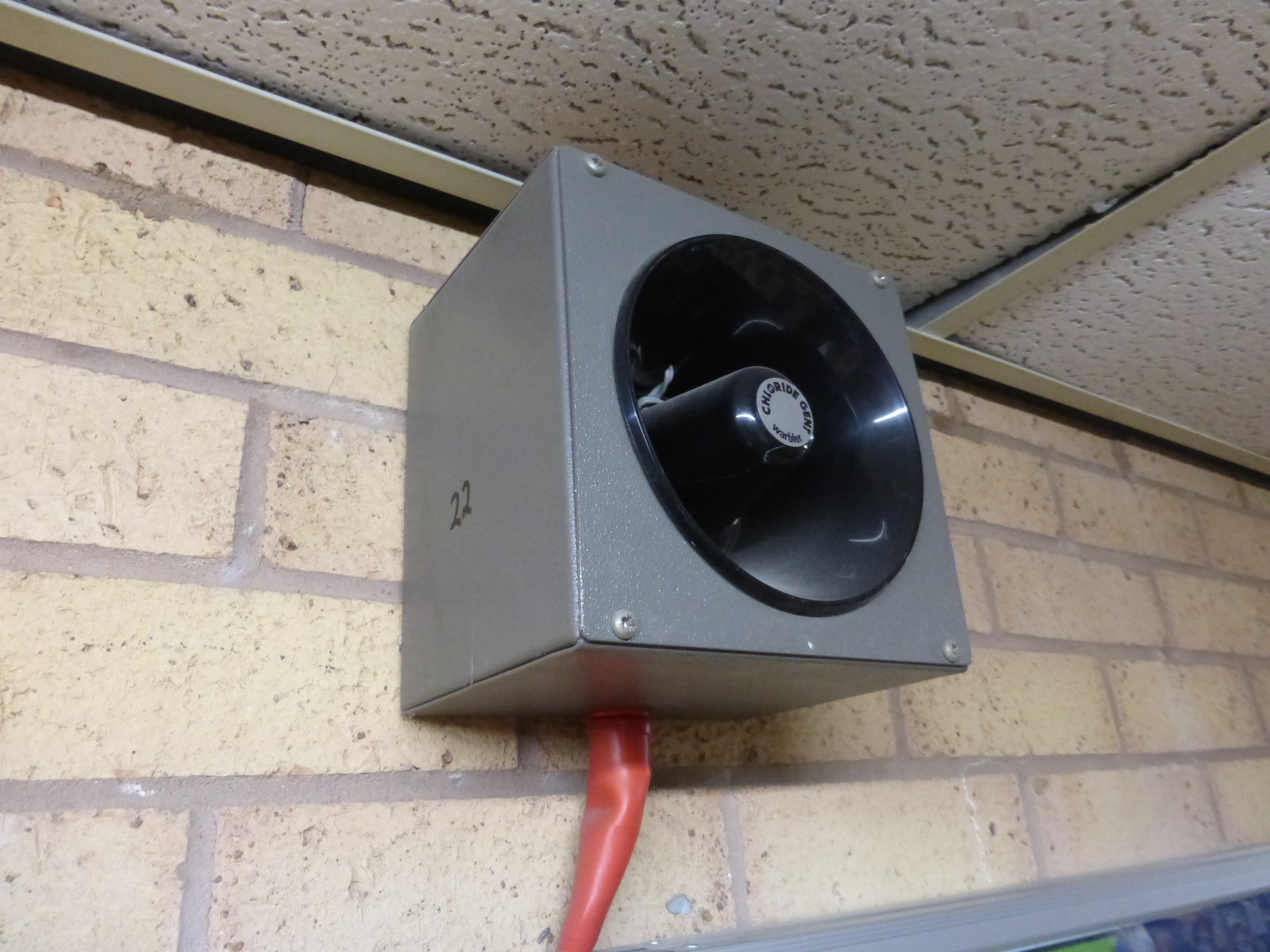
Chloride Gent Warbler, original fire alarm sounder, dating from 1980, at a secondary school in Derbyshire.

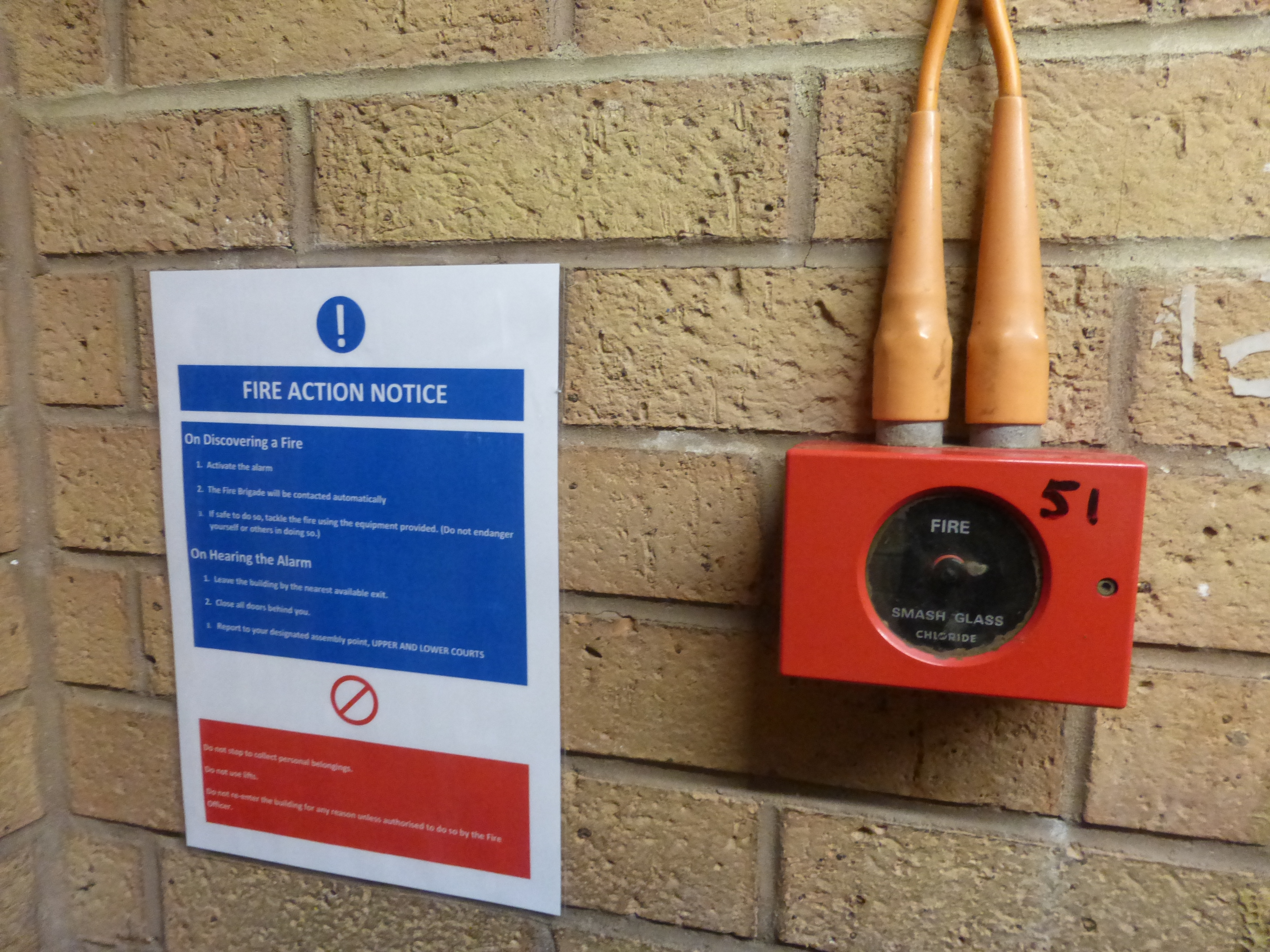
Model 1102 Manual Call Point, dating from 1980, just before removal from a secondary school in Derbyshire.

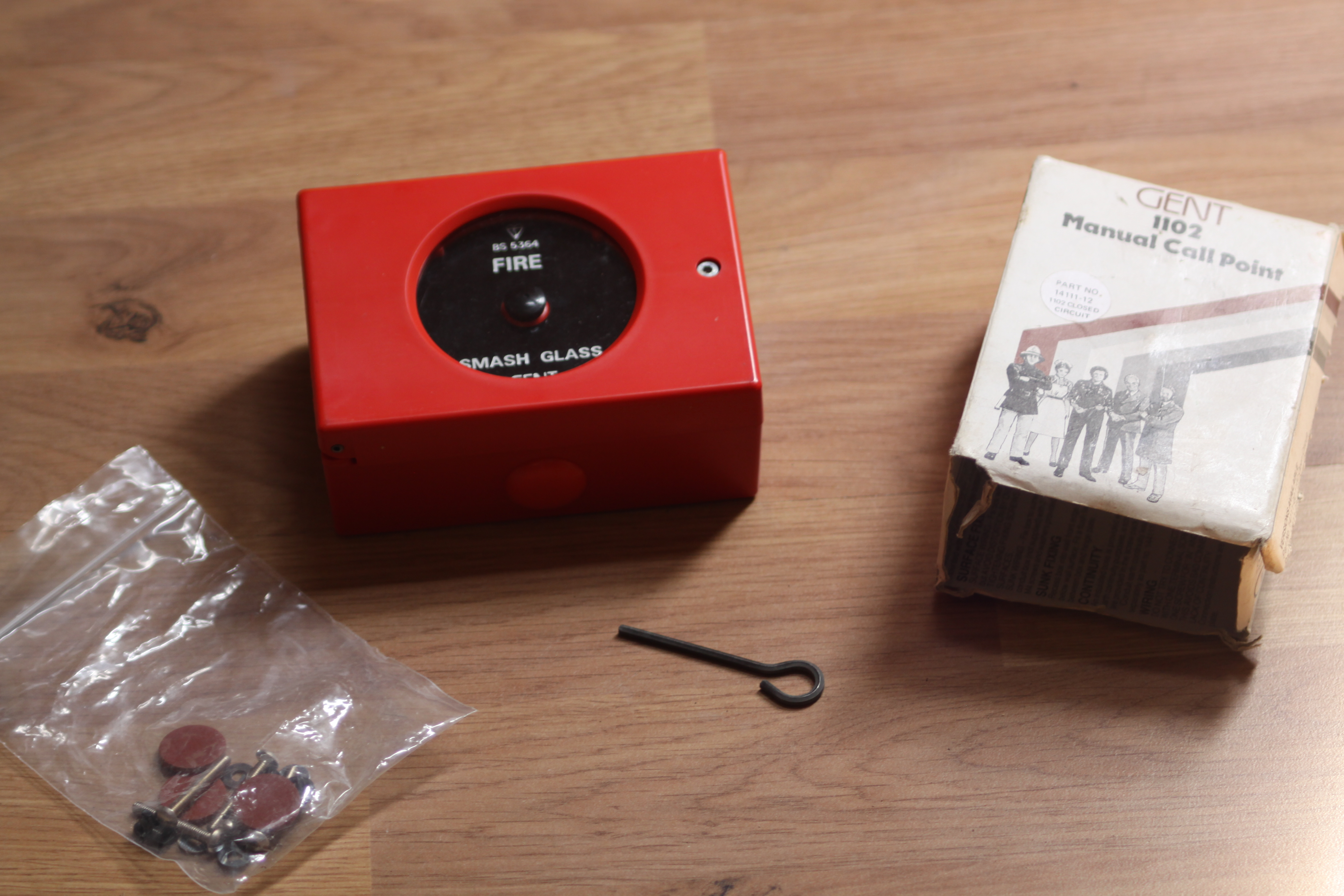
A later model Gent 1102 complete with box. Installation instructions were printed on the inside of the box.

=== Analogue Addressable Systems ===
==== System 3400, 3300 and 2400 ====
===== System 3400 and the 3217 Protocol =====
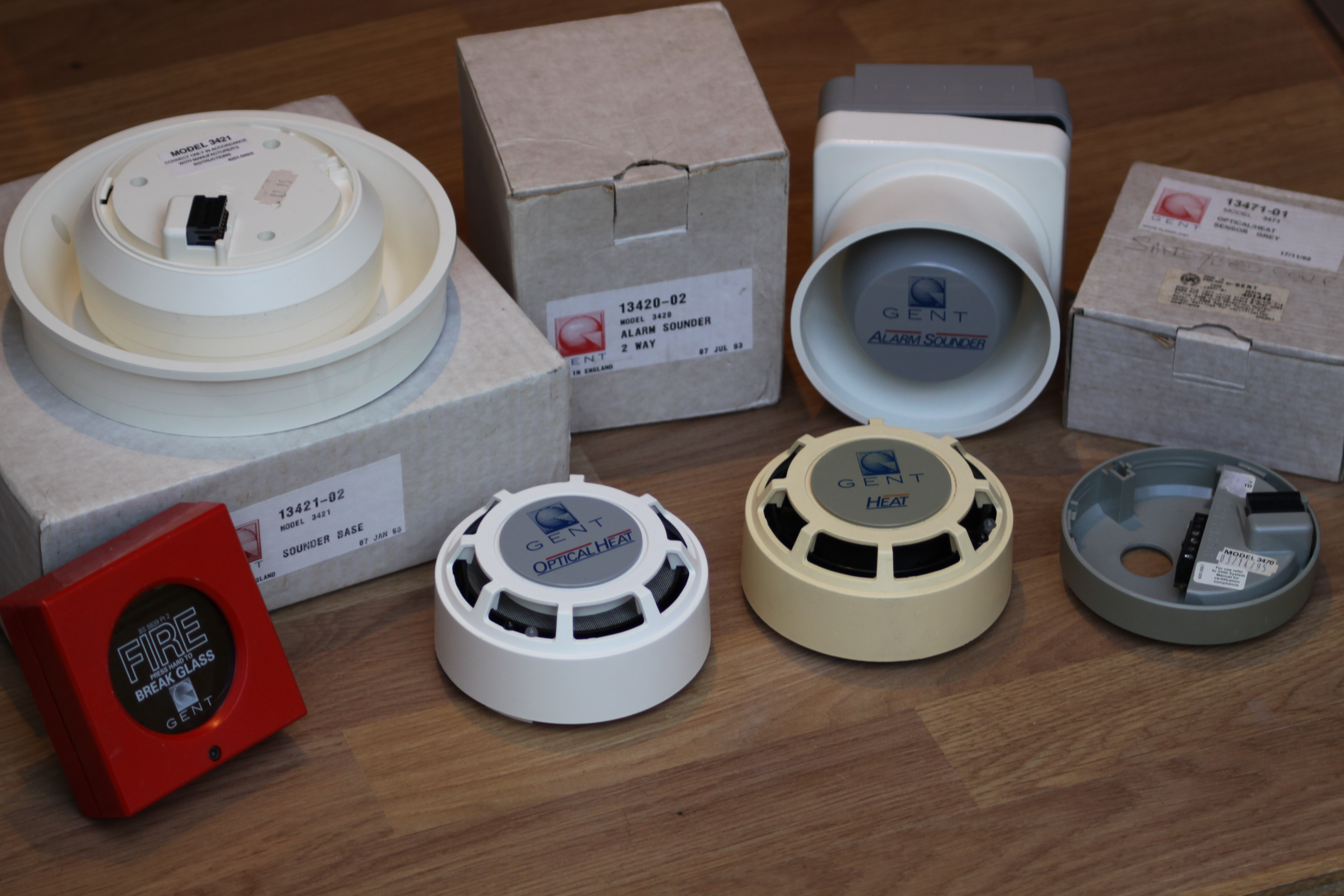
A Collection of Gent System 3400 Products.

The current Gent addressable protocol, called the Gent 3217 protocol, started with the launch of the System 3400 fire alarm system in 1985. The panel was one of the first addressable fire alarm systems ever created and was revolutionary compared to the simplistic conventional fire alarm systems that preceded it – both power and data could be carried across two conductors. System 3400 was available with both 4 and 8 loop panels (the 3404 and 3408 respectively). It was not until 1987 that loop-powered sounders would be available for system 3400, partly due to the difficulties in reducing their power consumption so as not to affect loop communication. These sounders (the 3420-02 and 3420–03), commonly referred to as 'Hornstyles', were available in both two-way and three-way models and with grey and white horn parts, with three way models having an additional pair of terminals for spurring off the addressable loop. Model 3421 base sounders were also available but were not as popular as the wall-mounted 3420s.

System 3400 used MCPs (Manual Call Points) similar to the Model 1195 however they were fitted with an addressable module and had the model number 3480. 3471 Optical Heat, 3472 Heat, and 3473 Ionisation detectors were all available and could be fitted to a 3470 two-way or three-way base. A range of interfaces for connection to external equipment were also available.

The Gent 3217 protocol supports multiple spurs and a mesh-like configuration although this was not utilised in the final product GB expired GB2168517B, David Appleby & Duncan Miles Johnson, "Information transmission system", published 1988-07-20, issued 1988-07-20, assigned to Novar Systems Ltd. The protocol is a simple implementation of asynchronous serial, with each frame having a start bit of 0, 8 bits of data, an odd parity bit and finally a stop bit of 1. For panel-to-device communication, a voltage of 0v is used to represent a logic 0, with logic 1 being represented by the normal loop operation voltage. Device-to-panel communication uses current pulses as is typical with most addressable fire systems.

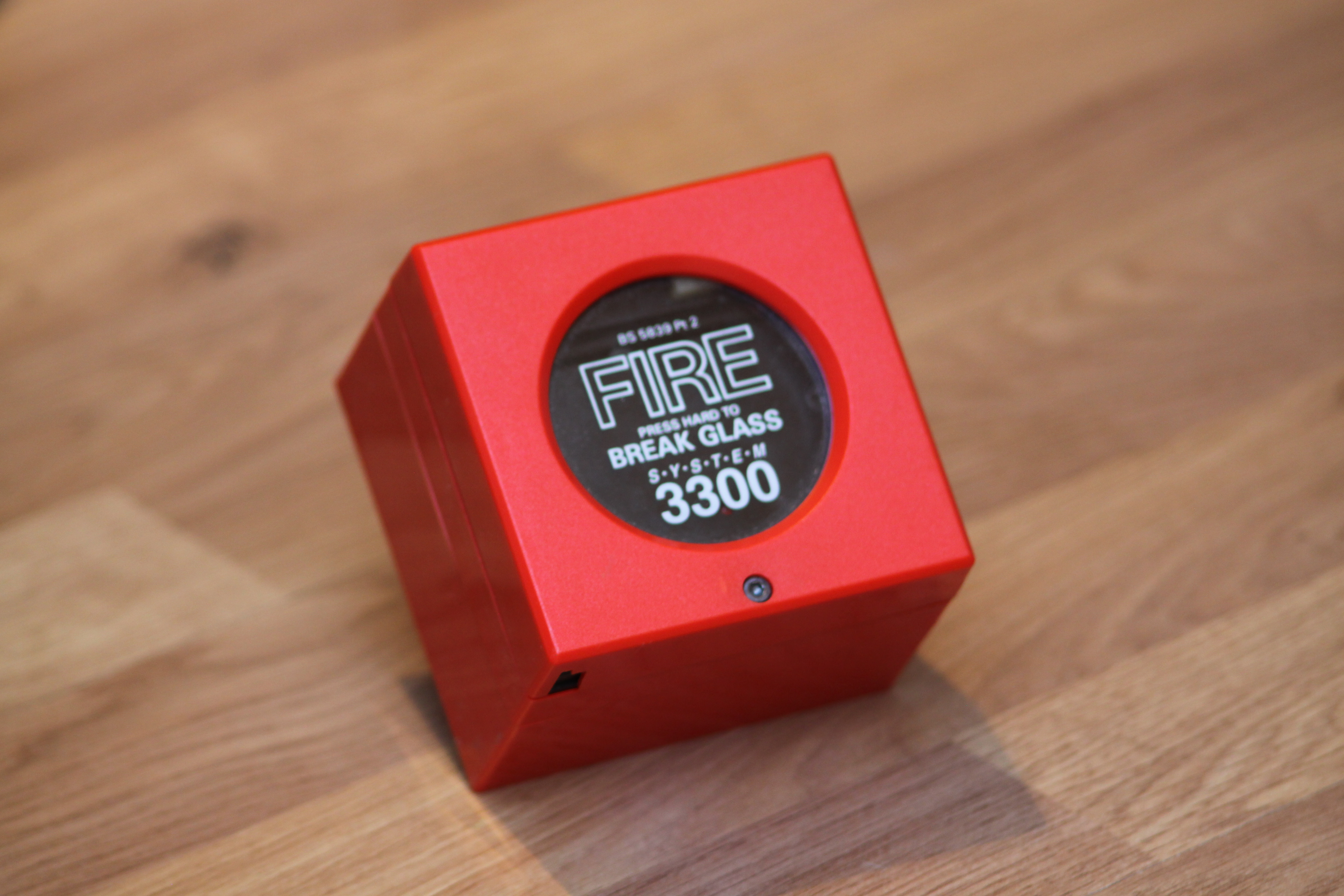
A Gent System 3300 3380 Manual Call Point.

===== System 3300 =====
System 3300 was a cut-down version of System 3400, marketed as a cheaper option for installers and businesses. It used the same 3217 protocol as System 3400 but was limited to 2 loops. Devices were similar to those of System 3400 however had more visible System 3300 branding. 3320 sounders had a white horn section instead of the more common grey style of 3420s.

System 3300 was sold as Senator under the SMS brand. Devices did not include the Senator branding although the panel included the Senator logo. A revised version of System 3300 was released, called System 3300 Mk 2. System 3300 Mk 2 used a panel design similar to System 32000's 32020 control panels.

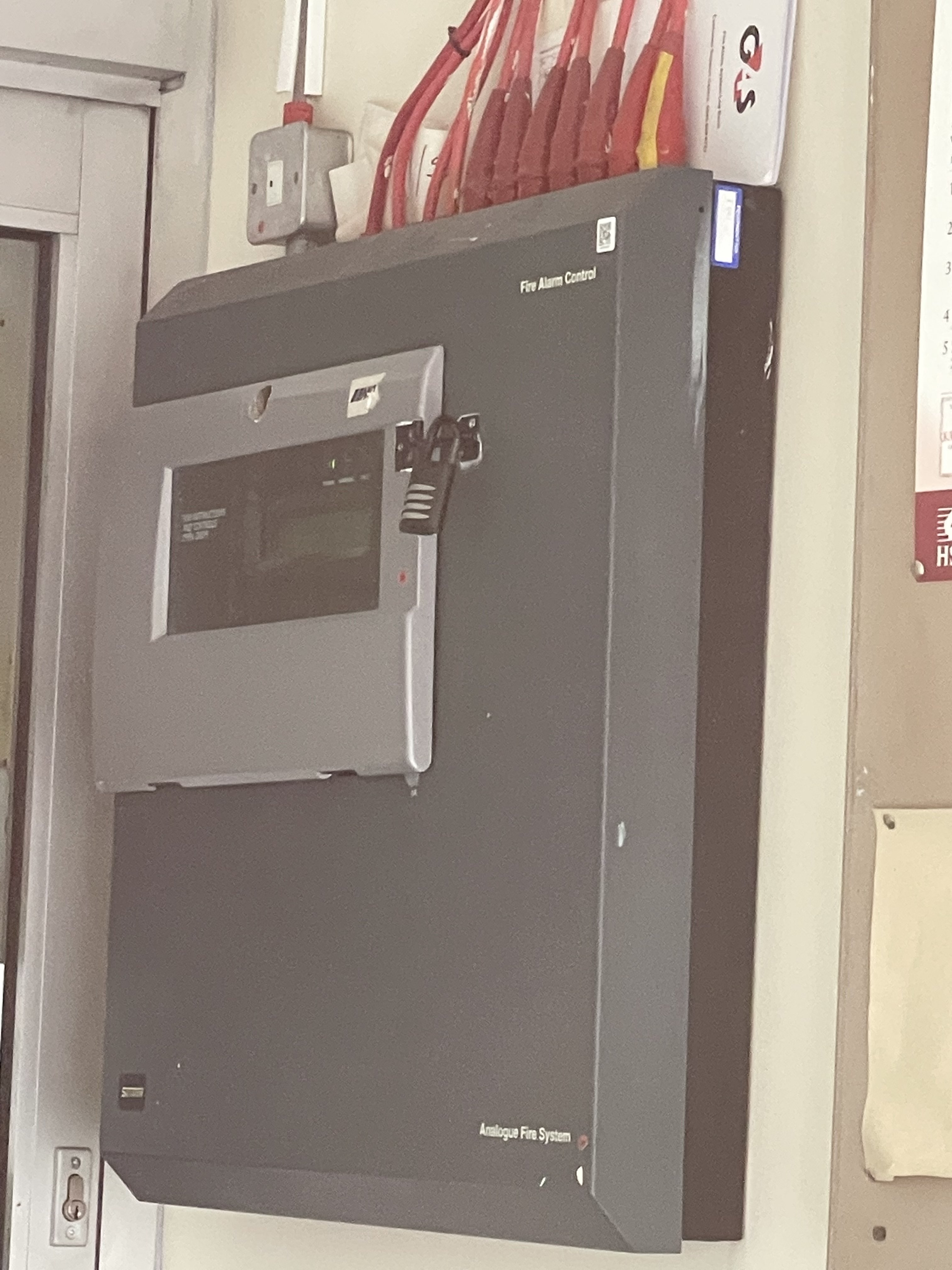
The SMS equivalent of the 3300 Mk 1 control panel.

===== System 2400 =====
System 2400 was an even more simplistic addressable system, limited to the one loop. It was also marketed as a cheaper option for installers and businesses and was a potential upgrade path for customers with conventional systems who wanted the advantages of addressable systems. System 2400 used conventional detectors fitted to Model 2420 addressable bases which were connected to zone modules on the addressable loop. A maximum of 16 zone modules could be connected to the loop. Compatible detectors included the 7630 Ionisation Detector, 7640 Optical Detector, 7650 Fixed Temperature Heat Detector, 7660 Rate of Rise Heat Detector and 7011 Beam Detector.

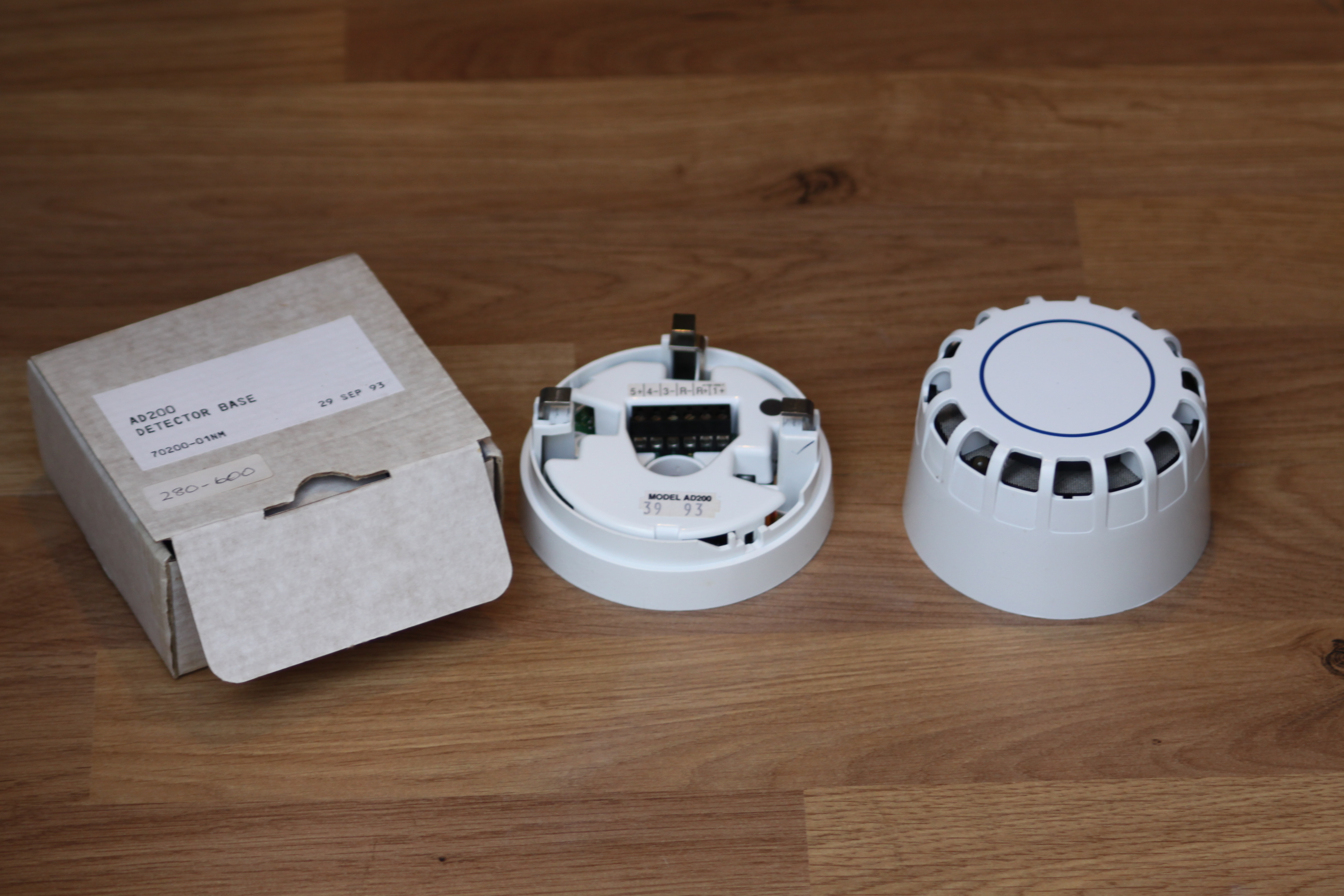
The SMS equivalent of a System 2400 detector and addressable base.

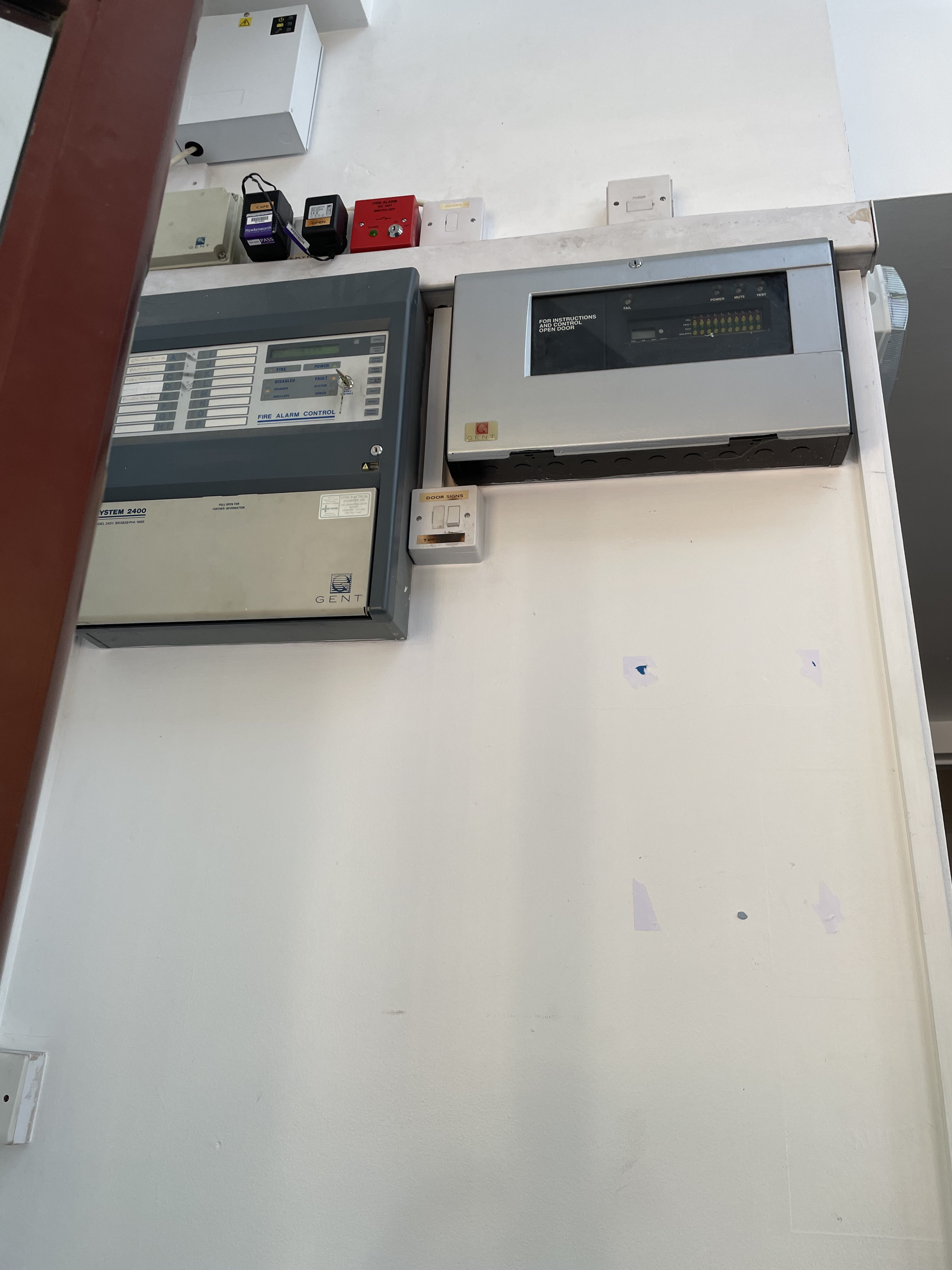
A Gent System 2400 Control Panel Model 2401 seen with a repeater panel.

==== System 34000, 32000 and 800 ====
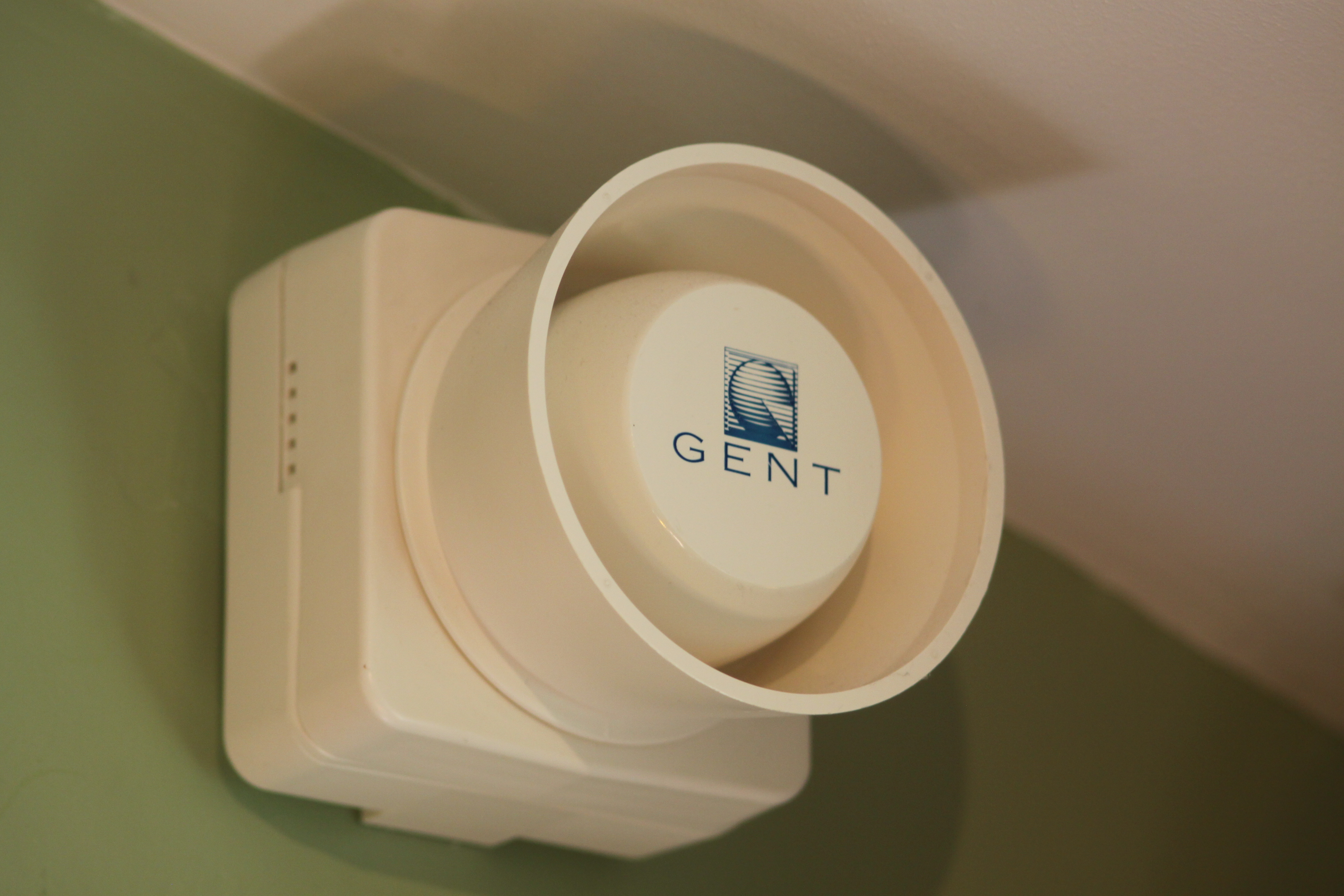
A Gent System 34000 34203 three-way sounder.

===== System 34000 =====
1995 saw the release of a new range of devices and panels. Following the acquisition by Caradon, Gent released the 34000 series of devices for sale with both System 3400 and System 34000. These devices were much more compact and had a more modern design. Model codes were relatively similar with most just having a 0 appended to their 3400 equivalent (e.g. the 3480 MCP became the 34800). Others such as the 3420-02/03 loop-powered sounder became the 34202/3. 34000-era MCPs can be identified by their red lever mechanism which supports the break glass element as opposed to the black mechanism of 3400-era devices. This generation also introduced a control panel design that would stay around until the 2017 release of the Gent Vigilon Plus. The 34000 series was marketed as a more advanced system with the ability for more loops and some more features that the 32000 panel didn't have. In 2019 Gent announced that they were officially discontinuing the 34000 device range, citing problems with part availability. To help upgrade unsupported systems, Gent released the 34000 S-Quad Adapter Base (S4-700-34k), allowing S-Quad detectors to be installed onto Vigilon systems running 34000 loops quickly and easily, without having to replace the 34700 detector bases. The S-Quad adapter base is not compatible with the 19279-01 Semi flush mounting kit or the 19279-10 Sensor Trim Ring. If either of these trim rings are used, the 34000 base must be removed, the ceiling repaired (or replaced), and a regular S4-700 base, or an S4-FLUSH base installed. The S-Quad adapter base is also not supported for use with 34000, or older panels, citing compatibility only with Vigilon and Vigilon Plus. While these devices may work with these older panels, using them on these panels (especially with the S-Quad adapter base) is unsupported and issues can arise, especially with voice sounder models. One of the devices released in the 34000 range was the 34770 optical heat sounder (optical smoke and heat sensor with integrated sounder).

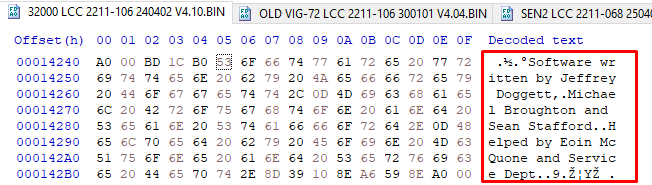
Software credits found in the firmware of a Gent 32020 panel's loop controller card: 'Software written by Jeffrey Doggett, Michael Broughton and Sean Stafford. Helped by Eoin McQuone and Service Dept.'

===== System 32000 =====
Released in 1996, System 32000 replaced System 3300 and saw a brand new panel design as well as devices similar to those in the 34000 range. Like System 3300, it was a cut-down cheaper option and was limited to 2 loops. System 32000 devices had a similar appearance to System 34000 devices but model numbers began with 32 instead of 34. Some devices had slightly changed model numbers to their 34000 equivalents such as the 32775 Optical Heat Sensor Sounder whose System 34000 equivalent was the 34770 Optical Heat Sensor Sounder. These devices were the first ever combined sensor sounder to be released by Gent. System 32000 devices are largely compatible with those from System 34000 as these systems share the same Gent 3217 protocol.

Like system 3300, System 32000 was also sold under the SMS brand name as Senator II. Senator II's panel had a blue colour compared to the grey colour of the Gent 32020 panel.

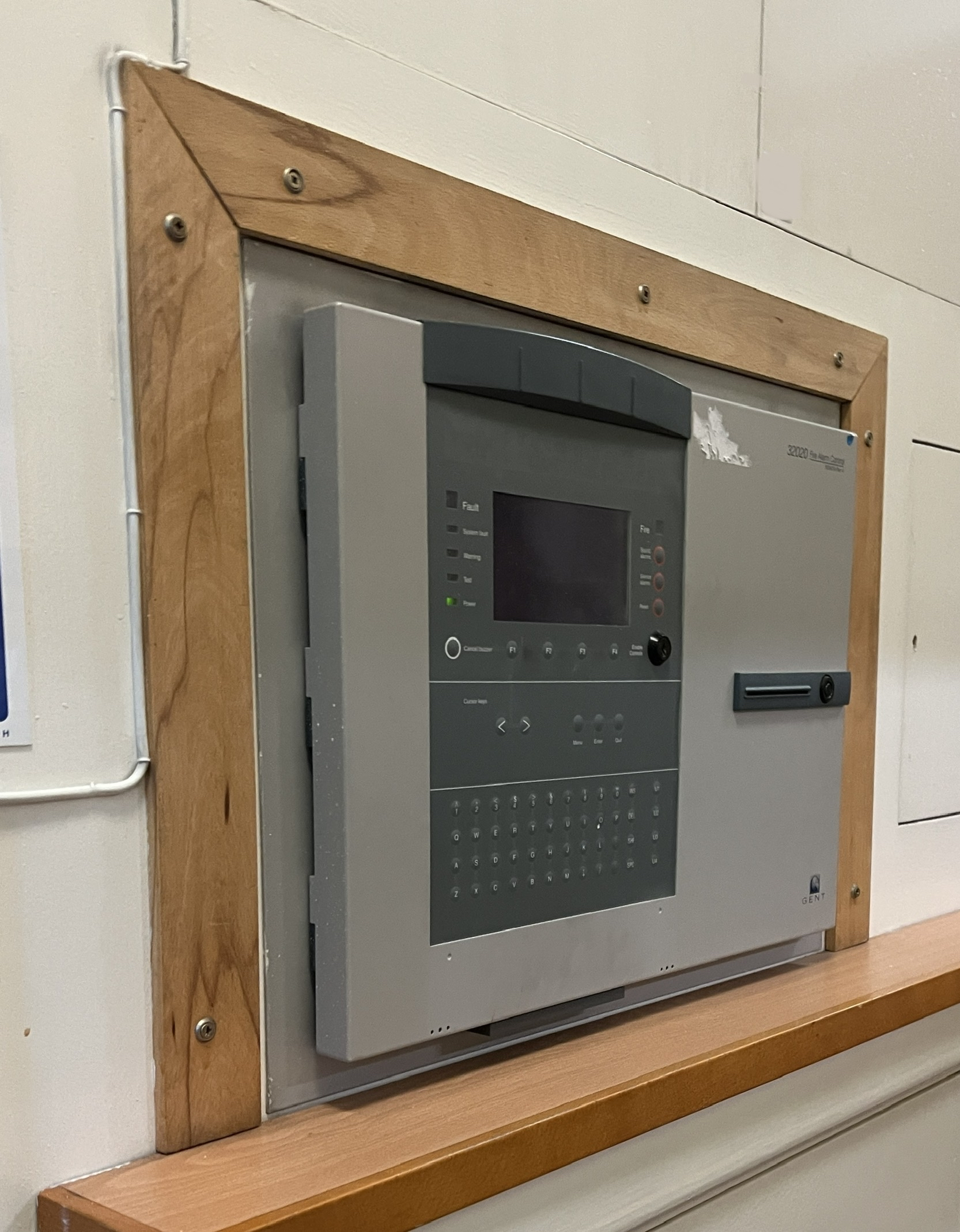
A Gent 32020 control panel seen flush-mounted

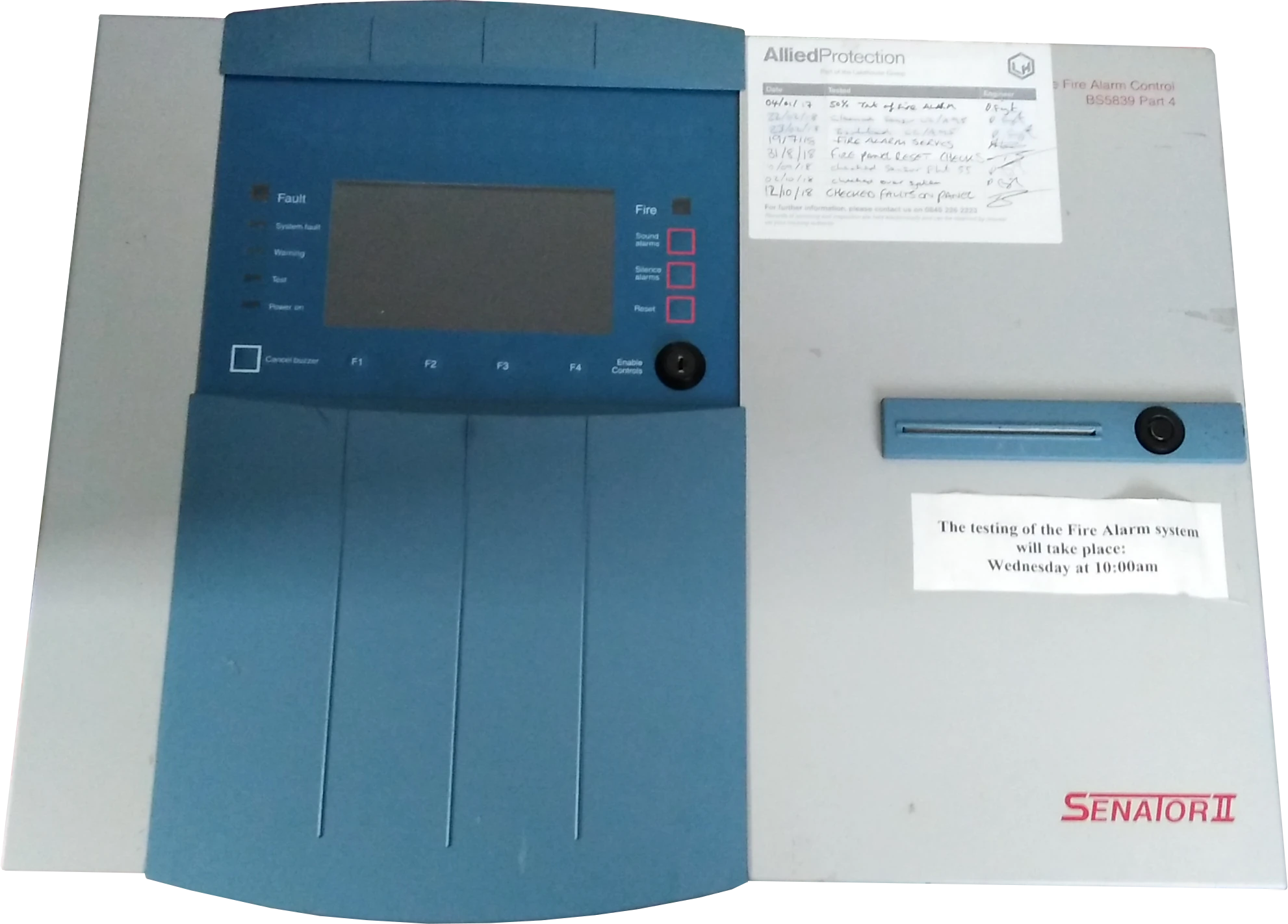
A SMS Senator II control panel

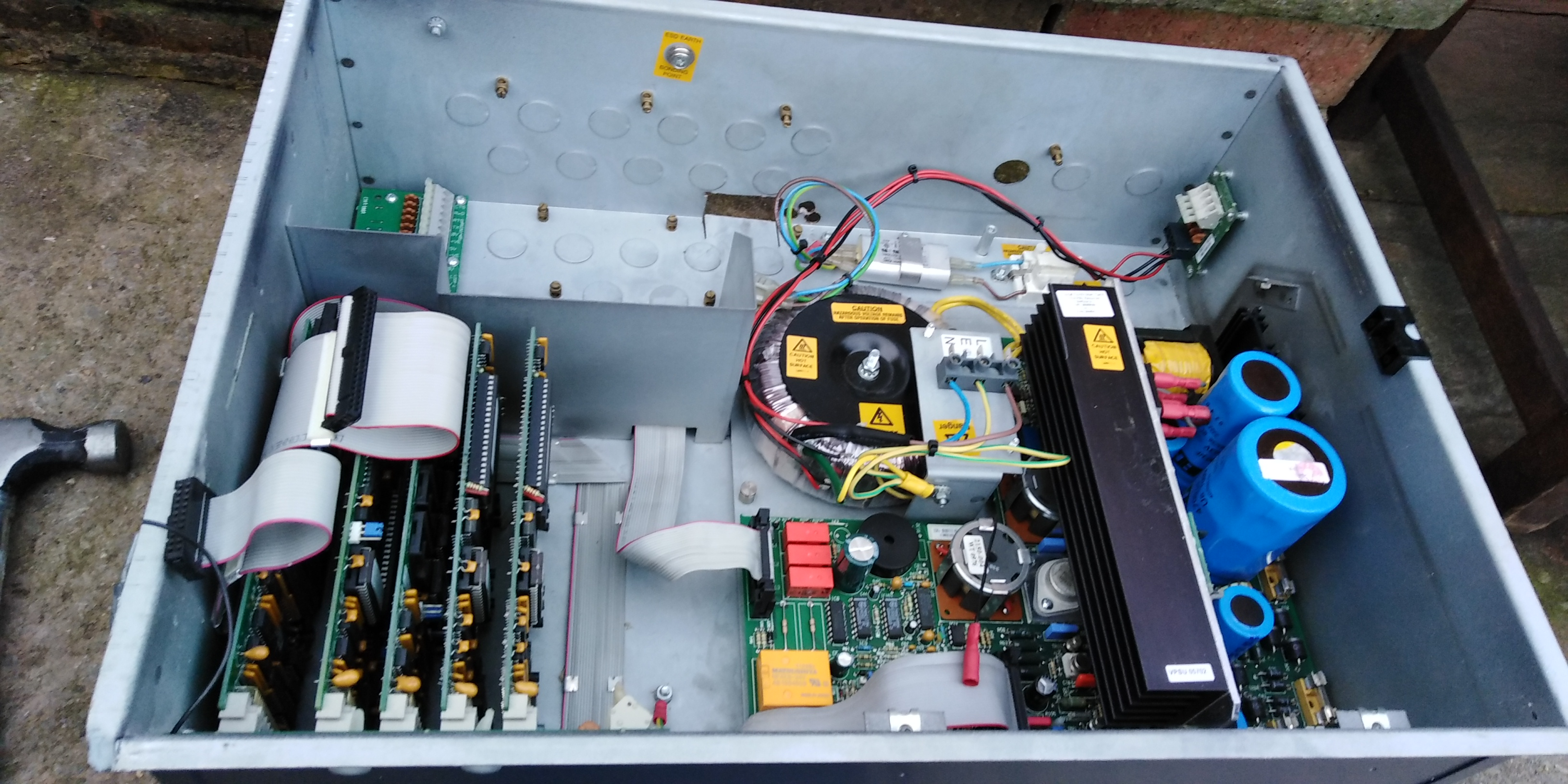
The insides of a SMS Senator II control panel (minus the power supply shroud)

===== System 800 =====
Continuing the hybrid-addressable range introduced with System 2400, System 800 brought a new, smaller panel and new devices. System 800 was sold under the SMS brand as the Europanel. It utilised the Gent conventional 17800 detector series, mounted on an addressable detector base.

==== Vigilon and Nano ====
===== Vigilon =====
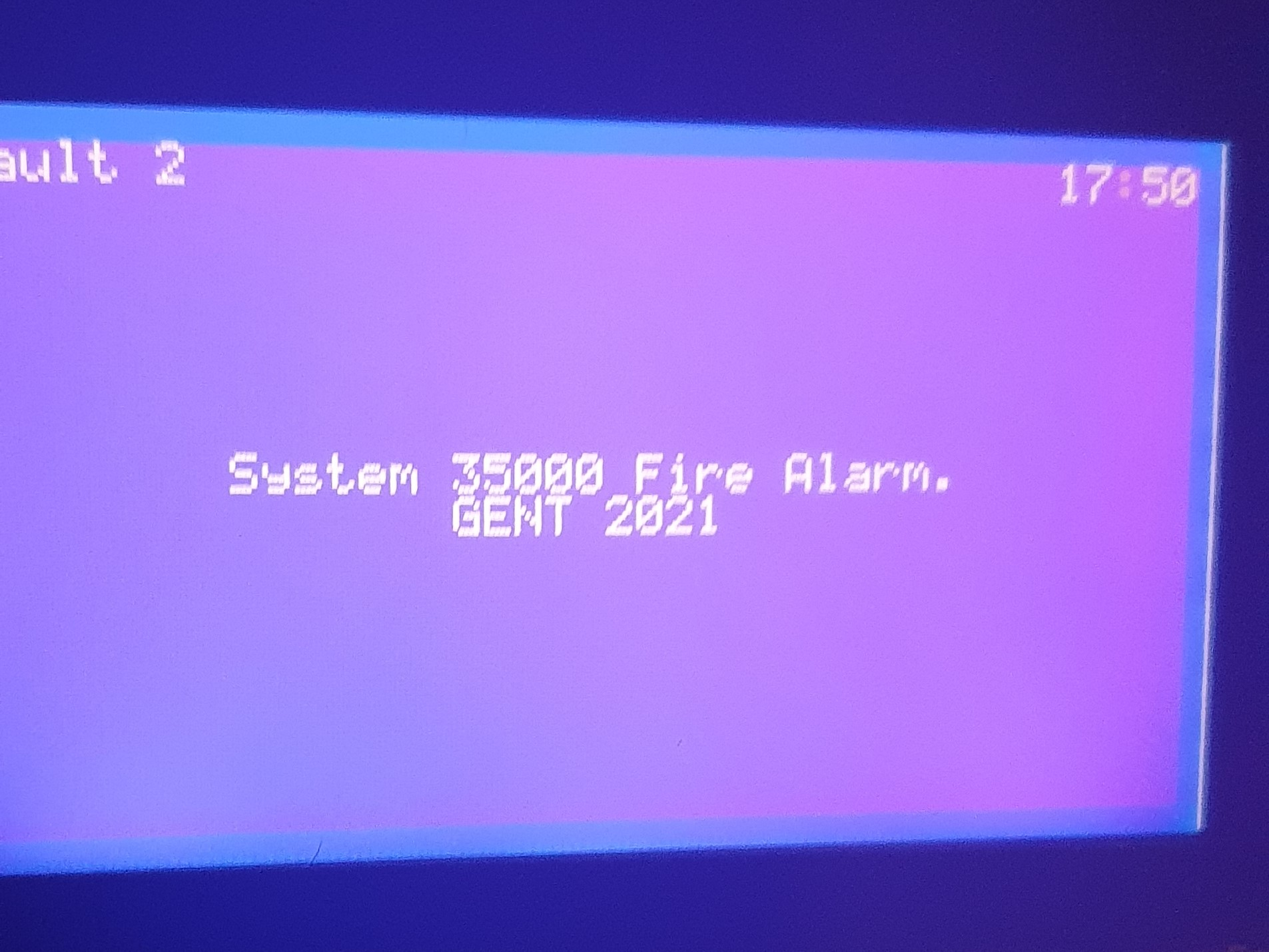
When connected to an early Vigilon, this 32025 repeater panel displays 'System 35000' on the main screen.

In 1997, the Vigilon was released. The original Vigilon features a blue LCD, and was originally released with the System 34000 devices as its device suite.

In 1999 the Vigilon was re-released, due to the release of a new set of sounders, detectors, and manual call points. This panel still featured a purple display. The panel was marketed with another 'Hornstyle' sounder, the VIG-SND, and detectors and call points that were again similar to the 32000 and 34000 devices. The Vigilon system has been sold under the SMS brand as Senator Advance, Sentri TWO (Vigilon compact) and Sentri FOUR (1-6 loop panel).

As Vigilon shares the same Gent 3217 protocol as previous Gent addressable fire alarm systems, it is mostly backwards compatible with 3400, 3300, 34000 and 32000 devices however some devices may require the Local Controller Card or Loop Controller firmware to be upgraded.

Around 2001, along with the first generation of S-Cubed (S3) sounders. Mark 1 S-Cubed Sounders are officially compatible with the 3400, 3300, 32000, and 34000 panels, but, depending on model, could require a panel firmware upgrade or loop card replacement. S2 devices were made as replacements for legacy three-way sounders often seen on 3400 and 34000 systems, and these devices are also compatible with Vigilon systems. The S2 Strobe was also introduced to allow strobes to be added to existing buildings with older Vigilon, 34000, 32000 or older systems.

In the early 2000s, a revision was made to the Vigilon, featuring a green, smaller, 8 line LCD, however the layout of the LEDs is the same as the previous EN and BS Vigilon systems.

In 2005, the Vigilon panel design was updated, and more LEDs to display more faults and issues to the end user.

As well as functioning as electronic sounders, S-Cubed devices can feature a voice function and a beacon function, which would later be replaced in 2014 with an EN54 compliant VAD with the release of the Mark 3 sounders. In 2005, the S-Quad was released, featuring a beacon, sounder, detector and voice sounder. Early models did not feature the Honeywell logo however this changed shortly after the acquisition by Honeywell. The S-Quad would be upgraded in 2014 to integrate an EN54 compliant VAD. It was one of the first devices to no longer officially support the 34000 and older panels, followed by the Mark 2 and Mark 3 S-Cubed Sounders, however some models could still function on these older panels. A common problem with S3 Mark 2 and 3 and S4 devices on older panels is voice functionality being unpredictable. Older addressable panels lack the functionality to sync voice messages across the loop and so voice may not work or may play at unpredictable intervals out of sync. Some earlier BS Vigilon panels can be upgraded with the V3+ main controller card, allowing them to run S-Quad devices.

In 2007, Gent released the S4-34800 call point range, officially completing the initial S-Quad line.

The only S4 devices that are almost fully compatible with the 34000 and 32000 systems are the S4-34800 Call Point range. This is likely due to the fact that these call points send the same signal to the panel. The green polling LED on the call point does not work and continuously remains on. The red activation LED does still work normally.

In 2017, the Vigilon Plus was released. A minor revision to the panel, it added little functionality, bearing more cosmetic changes than functional changes, however a new SD card reader was added to allow configuration information to be transferred to the Vigilon using the SD card slot. It also changed the layout of the panel, with both changes to the panel controls wise and the internal design of the panel, along with a new, black, panel door, with a marked 'Honeywell Gent' logo rather than a Vigilon logo sticker.

In 2019, Gent released the SAFE, a device and interface system designed to reduce false alarms in residential buildings. Gent also revised the S-Quad and S-Cubed, with software V1.20, however there aren't any noticeable difference besides an increased tone hold length and improved quality of voice messages on voice sounders, as the devices are functionally and visually the same as the previous versions released in 2014.

All Gent sounders may hold their tone when a silence is issued from the panel. This is done to allow the devices to stop sounding at the same time. In 2019, the length of the tone hold was increased with minor revisions to the S-Quad and S-Cubed range. It isn't known why this decision was made.

In 2023, Gent introduced a new range of S-Quad Detectors that are able to self-test both the heat and smoke elements of the detector. In applicable devices, the new S-Quad range uses real (aerosol) smoke to test the optical smoke sensor and ensure that the detector's entry points are not blocked. The detector temporarily disables itself to ensure that the testing process does not cause a system activation and/or a fire evacuation. These devices are also designed so that if another device (whether it is another S-Quad or a manual call point) is activated on the system, the self-test feature will be disabled and the fire system will return to normal functionality while other devices remain in an activated state. The self-test feature can be used a maximum of 60 times for optical sensors and 100 times for heat sensors, which equates to an expected life of up to 14 years of optical detection self-testing, and 20 years of heat detetection self-testing, with an expected maximum of 4 self-test and 4 manual tests a year, before the detectors need to be replaced. The new range of S-Quads also feature a Bluetooth Low Energy beacon, which is used to allow for the S-Quad devices to be managed and maintained from a mobile device using Gent's new Connected Life Safety Services (CLSS) app, which allows for the detectors to be located, device information, such as device names, zones, and loop mapping to be corrected without using the Commissioning Tool or the Vigilon panel's front-end controls. In addition to this, the app allows for the Fire LED on each sensor to be tested, which is currently a pending requirement of BS5839-1, and for the detector's self-disablement feature to be temporarily disabled so that the self-test feature to activates the sensor, allowing for the cause and effect logic of the Vigilon System to be tested. The app also generates monitoring testing and maintenance reports. In addition to the above, the new S-Quad range features a slightly revised design with a new IP21 external moulding, a new detector smoke chamber design and a new dual microprocessor PCB. This means that these sensors also feature better, more accurate smoke detection and higher quality voice messages, while remaining compatible with the S4-700 and S4BK-700 detector bases. The new range of S-Quad devices requires the EN54-compliant loop cards to be installed in the Vigilon Panel. The new detector range is compatible with older Vigilon, Vigilon Compact, and Nano systems, provided that EN54 compliant loop cards are installed, but only as a detector, and audio-visual device, as the self-test and CLSS features are not supported. The self-test feature requires a Vigilon Plus or Compact Plus system, with EN54 compliant loop cards installed, additionally requiring that the main controller board (on Vigilon Plus systems), main controller card (on Vigilon Compact Plus systems) and the loop cards are updated to the latest firmware. It also requires that the compatible system has a CLSS gateway installed and linked to the system. If multiple Vigilon systems are networked, the CLSS gateway is only required to be installed once per network domain.

It appears that the previous Mark 2 and Mark 1 S4 detector range will remain compatible and will be able to be installed on the same loop as the new self-test detectors, meaning that an existing, compatible system can have its sensors upgraded to self-test models gradually, without affecting the functionality of the system. However, Gent does not appear to have released a new sensor capable of detecing carbon monoxide, which was available in the previous S-Quad Range, however, it is highly likely that the previous mark 2 S-Quad detector range, released in 2019, will remain on sale.

===== Vigilon Compact =====
In the early 2000s, Gent released the Vigilon Compact, a similar concept to System 32000. Again limited to 2 loops, the system was designed as a cheaper alternative for smaller sites. The Vigilon Compact does not feature a full QWERTY keyboard and requires a different form factor of loop card. The Vigilon Compact shares the same devices as Vigilon.

Following the release of the Vigilon Compact (around 2006), Gent released the Vigilon Compact Voice, a Vigilon Compact system that also featured an integrated PA/VA system. This allowed for an all-in-one solution to be installed, where voice speakers, detection, call points and sounders could all be installed as part of one system. This allowed the building to use a mix of Gent S3 and S4 sounders/sounder detectors and Voice Alarm devices. This was discontinued shortly after the release of the Honeywell D1 Voice Alarm System.

In 2017, the Vigilon Compact Plus was released. This, similar to the Vigilon Plus, does not add any significant changes to the panel design, introducing the SD card reader, a small change to the design of the controls, a full QWERTY keyboard, and the black panel door.

===== Nano =====
In 2009, Gent released the Nano, a small, single loop panel designed to be a cheaper alternative to a full Vigilon or Vigilon Compact. The Nano has a drastically different user interface to both Vigilon panels and requires its own separate commissioning software. Nano uses the same device suite as Vigilon (with the exception of the Self Test sensors, which require Vigilon or Vigilon Compact systems) but has a smaller, more stylish control panel design.

==== Software ====
For many years, Gent has released commissioning software for its analogue addressable range of fire alarm control panels. The Vigilon and Vigilon Compact control panels are compatible with the Vigilon Commissioning Tool, allowing for the configuration of complex cause and effect as well as voice messages for voice-enabled S3 and S4 devices. Separate software has been released for other panels such as System 32000, System 800 and the Nano. Mimic panels require their own configuration software, separate to the main commissioning software.

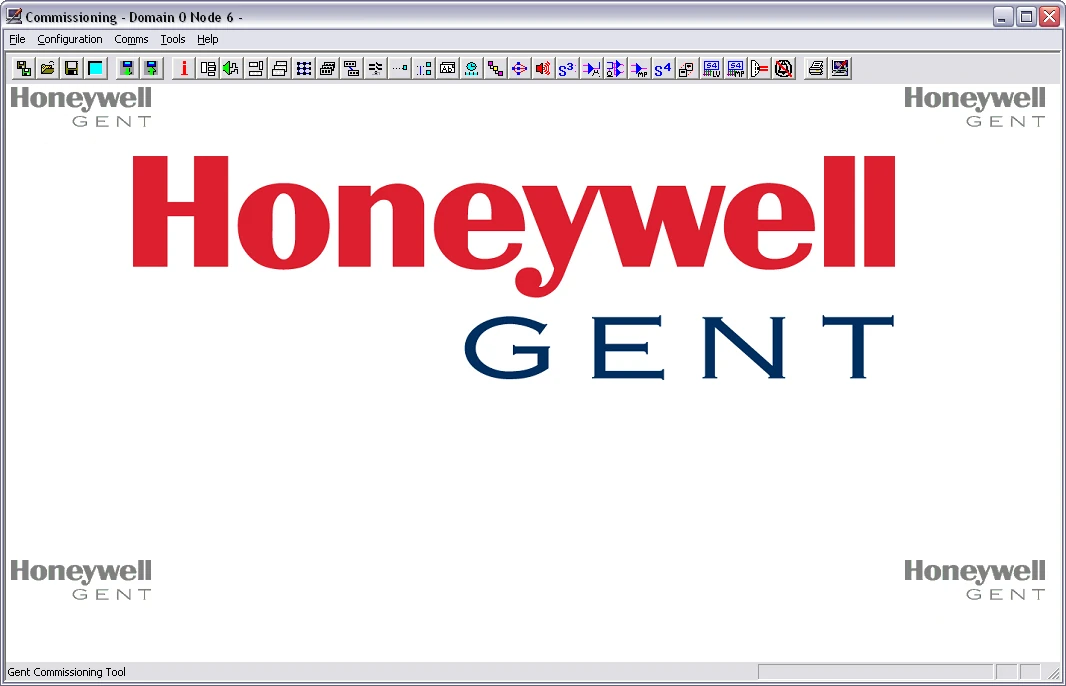
The Vigilon Commissioning Tool for use on Gent Vigilon control panels.

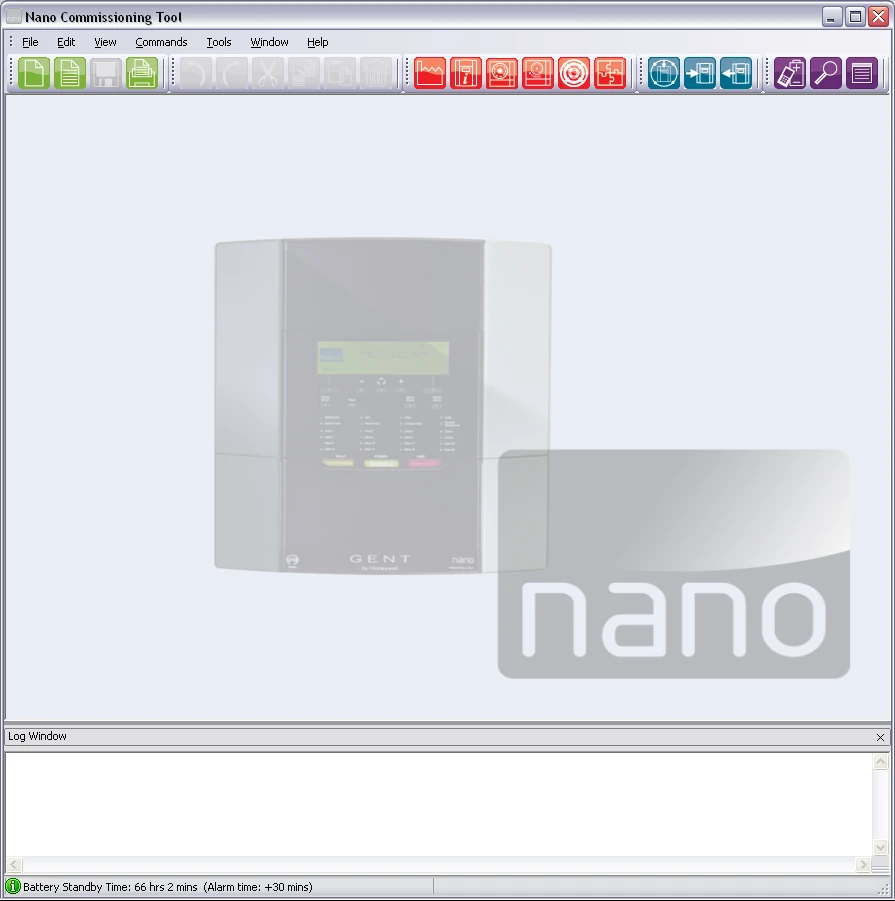
The Nano Commissioning Tool for use on Gent Nano control panels.

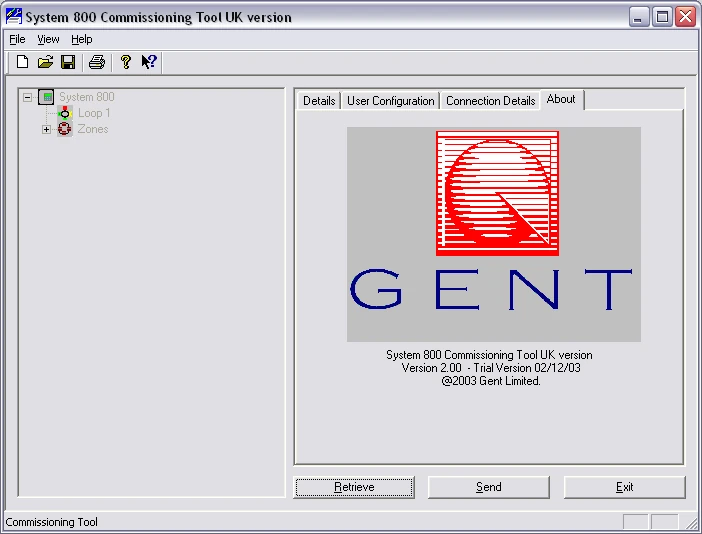
The System 800 Commissioning Tool for use on Gent System 800 control panels.

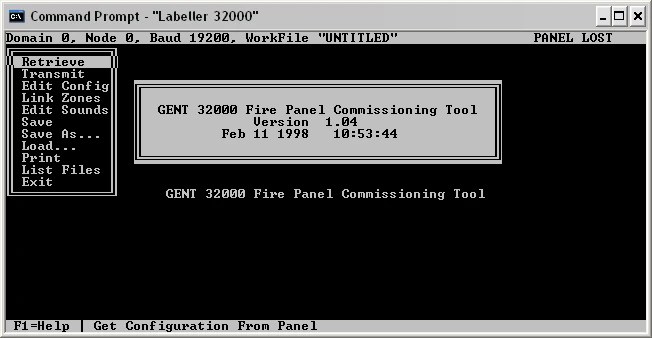
The System 32000 Commissioning Tool, Labeller 32000.

==== Sounder Tones ====
All Gent loop-powered sounders can output 3 different tones, except on older panels, where there is only support for 2 tones, and the Nano, where there is support for 4 tones. These tones can be customised in the commissioning tool, for example, disabling the voice function for a tone, or disabling the strobe or VAD for a tone, and there are limited customisation options available from the panel itself. In addition to this, there is an additional bell tone that can be enabled in the commissioning tool on S-Quad and S-Cubed devices that are fitted with a voice sounder. Signal 3 in the 2019 update was changed slightly from "Attention please, This is an emergency, please leave the building by the nearest available exit!" to " Attention please, please leave the building by the nearest available exit!

There is also an additional tone used individually on sounders to locate them, known as find device, or Signal 0.

The default configuration for sounders on a Vigilon panel are as follows:

Tones on Gent Addressable Sounders
Signal	Tone	Voice Message (Voice sounders only)	VAD/Strobe activation (VAD/Strobe devices only)	Bell Tone support (Voice Sounders only)
Signal 0 (Find Device)	Intermittent	This is a test message, no action is required. (female voice)	✓	×
Signal 1 (Alert Signal)	Intermittent	An incident has been reported in the building, please await further instructions. (female voice)	✓	✓
Signal 2 (Fire Evacuation)	Alternating	This is a fire alarm! Please leave the building immediately by the nearest available exit. (male voice)	✓	×
Signal 3 (Emergency Evacuation)	Continuous	Attention please, please leave the building by the nearest available exit. (female voice)	✓	✓

The S-Quad and S-Cubed voice sounders are fitted with flash memory chips, that store the voice messages, along with the bell tone. The contents of the flash chip are ordered as follows:

Storage of voice messages on Gent Voice Sounders
Message	Contents	Corresponding alert signal
Message 1	Bell tone	N/A by default (Can be set up for Signal 1 and 3)
Message 2	Attention please, please leave the building by the nearest available exit. (female voice)	Signal 3
Message 3	An incident has been reported in the building, please await further instructions. (female voice)	Signal 1
Message 4	This is a test message, no action is required. (female voice)	Signal 0
Message 5	This is a fire alarm! Please leave the building immediately by the nearest available exit. (male voice)	Signal 2

It is possible to have these voice messages re-written to custom messages e.g. for example designed for a specific building.

==== EN54 Compliant Loop Cards ====
In 2014, after the release of the High Power VAD S-Cubed and S-Quad devices, Gent released a more powerful loop card that was capable of taking advantage of the full power of these devices. However, despite using the same Gent 2317 protocol, compatibility with some devices, such as earlier S-Quad sounder detectors and 34000 detectors, is limited, and in some cases, such as with some 3400 and 34000 devices, is not available at all. Power output to newer devices is also limited if older S-Quad, S-Cubed, and 34000 devices are used on the same loop. EN54 Complaint loop cards are required for S-Quad Self-Test Detectors. A list of compatible devices is available below:

Devices compatible with the EN54 Compliant Loop Card
Device	Year of Manufacture	Loop Diagnostics	EN54 Compliant Loop Card card running at 800ma, with less than 2 km total cable run (VIG-LPC-EN, COMPACT-LPC-EN)	EN54 Compliant Loop Card card running at 400ma, with less than 2 km total cable run (VIG-LPC-EN, COMPACT-LPC-EN)	EN54 Compliant Loop Card running at 400ma, with less than 1 km total cable run (VIG-LPC-EN, COMPACT-LPC-EN)	Legacy Loop card running at 400ma, with less than 1 km total cable run (VIG-LPC, COMPACT-LPC)
Sensors
S-Quad Sensors	2005–present	✓	✓	✓	✓	✓
S-Quad Self-Test Sensors	2023–present	✓	✓, requires a Vigilon Plus or Compact Plus system for full functionality	✓, requires a Vigilon Plus or Compact Plus system for full functionality	✓, requires a Vigilon Plus or Compact Plus system for full functionality	×, self-test devices require EN54 compliant loop cards
S-Quad Sensor Sounders	2005–2013	✓	×	✓	✓	✓
S-Quad Sensor Sounders (with Fall Back Function)	2014–present	✓	✓	✓	✓	✓
S-Quad Self-Test Sensor Sounders	2023–present	✓	✓, requires a Vigilon Plus or Compact Plus system for full functionality	✓, requires a Vigilon Plus or Compact Plus system for full functionality	✓, requires a Vigilon Plus or Compact Plus system for full functionality	×, self-test devices require EN54 compliant loop cards
S-Quad Sensor Sounder Strobe	2005–2013	✓	×	✓	✓	✓
S-Quad Sensor Sounders with EN54-23 VADs	2014–present	✓	✓	✓	✓	✓, but runs in compatibility mode, at the same power as a standard power VAD.
S-Quad Self-Test Sensor Sounders with EN54-23 VADs	2023–present	✓	✓, requires a Vigilon Plus or Compact Plus system for full functionality	✓, requires a Vigilon Plus or Compact Plus system for full functionality	✓, requires a Vigilon Plus or Compact Plus system for full functionality	×, self-test devices require EN54 compliant loop cards
34000 Sensor	1995–2019	×	×	×	✓	✓
34000 Sensor Sounders	1995–2019	×	×	×	✓	✓
3400 Sensor	1987–1996	×	×	×	×	✓
Sounders
S-Cubed Mark 3 Sounders	2014–present	✓	✓	✓	✓	✓
S-Cubed Mark 3 Sounders with EN54-23 VAD	2014–present	✓	✓	✓	✓	✓, but runs in compatibility mode, at the same power as a standard power VAD.
S-Cubed Mark 2 Voice	2005–2013	✓	×	✓	✓	✓
S-Cubed Mark 2 Sounder & Strobe	2013 – 2013	✓	×	✓	✓	✓
S-Cubed Mark 1 Sounder	2002–2013	✓	×	✓	✓	✓
S-Cubed Mark 1 Sounder & Strobe	2002–2013	✓	×	✓	✓	✓
34000 Sounders	1996–2002	×	×	×	×	✓
3400 Sounders	1986–1996	×	×	×	×	✓
Manual Call Points
S-Quad MCP (S4 MCP)	2007–present	✓	✓	✓	✓	✓
34000 MCP	1995–2019	✓	✓	✓	✓	✓
3400 MCP	1987–1996	×	×	×	✓	✓
Interfaces
S-Quad Mains Switching Interfaces	2011–present	✓	✓	✓	✓	✓
S-Quad Mains Powered Interfaces	2011–present	✓	✓	✓	✓	✓
S-Quad Loop Powered Interfaces	2007–present	✓	✓	✓	✓	✓
34000 Mains Powered Interface	1995–2007	✓	×	✓	✓	✓
34000 Loop Powered Interface	1995–2007	✓	×	✓	✓	✓
3400 Mains Powered Interface	1987–1996	×	×	×	✓	✓
3400 Loop Powered Interface	1987–1996	×	×	×	✓	✓
Panels (installed in panel)
32000 series	1996–1999	×	×	×	×	✓
3300 series	? - ?	×	×	×	×	?
3400 series	1987–2000	×	×	×	×	✓
34000 series	1995–1999	?	?	?	?	✓
Vigilon BS	2000–2007	×	×	×	×	✓
Vigilon 4 Loop	2000 – Jul 2013	✓, as long as Master Control Card is upgraded to firmware V4.51 or greater.	×	✓	✓	✓
Vigilon 6 Loop	2000 – Jul 2013	✓, as long as Master Control Card is upgraded to firmware V4.51 or greater.	×	✓	✓	✓
Vigilon 4 Loop	August 2013 – 2017	✓, as long as Master Control Card is upgraded to firmware V4.51 or greater.	✓	✓	✓	✓
Vigilon 6 Loop	August 2013 – 2017	✓, as long as Master Control Card is upgraded to firmware V4.51 or greater.	✓	✓	✓	✓
Vigilon Compact	2003–2017	✓, as long as Master Control Board is upgraded to firmware V4.51 or greater.	✓	✓	✓	✓
Vigilon Compact Voice	2003–2013	✓, as long as Master Control Board is upgraded to firmware V4.51 or greater.	✓	✓	✓	✓
Gent Nano	2009–present	?	?	?	?	?
Vigilon Plus 4 Loop	2017–present	✓, as long as Master Control Card is upgraded to firmware V4.51 or greater.	✓	✓	✓	✓
Vigilon Plus 6 Loop	2017–present	✓, as long as Master Control Card is upgraded to firmware V4.51 or greater.	✓	✓	✓	✓
Vigilon Plus Compact	2017–present	✓, as long as Master Control Board is upgraded to firmware V4.51 or greater.	✓	✓	✓	✓

The new Loop Card software is not available in BS protocol therefore the new card is not compatible with 3400 panels and any BS protocol Vigilon (or 34000 export) panels.

If older devices, such as earlier S-Quad and S-Cubed sounder and sounder strobe devices are on the loop, the loop cannot run in high power mode at 800ma, but these devices can still support a 2 km total loop span, where as older devices, such as the 3400, 32000, 34000 etc detectors and sounders cannot run on a loop with a total span longer than 1 km, meaning the loop card operates at the same power rate and maximum distance as the regular, non-EN54 compliant loop card.

S-Quad Self-Test devices require an EN54 compliant loop card to be installed, and require a Vigilon Plus or Compact Plus panel for the Self-Test and CLSS features to work.

=== Conventional Fire Systems ===
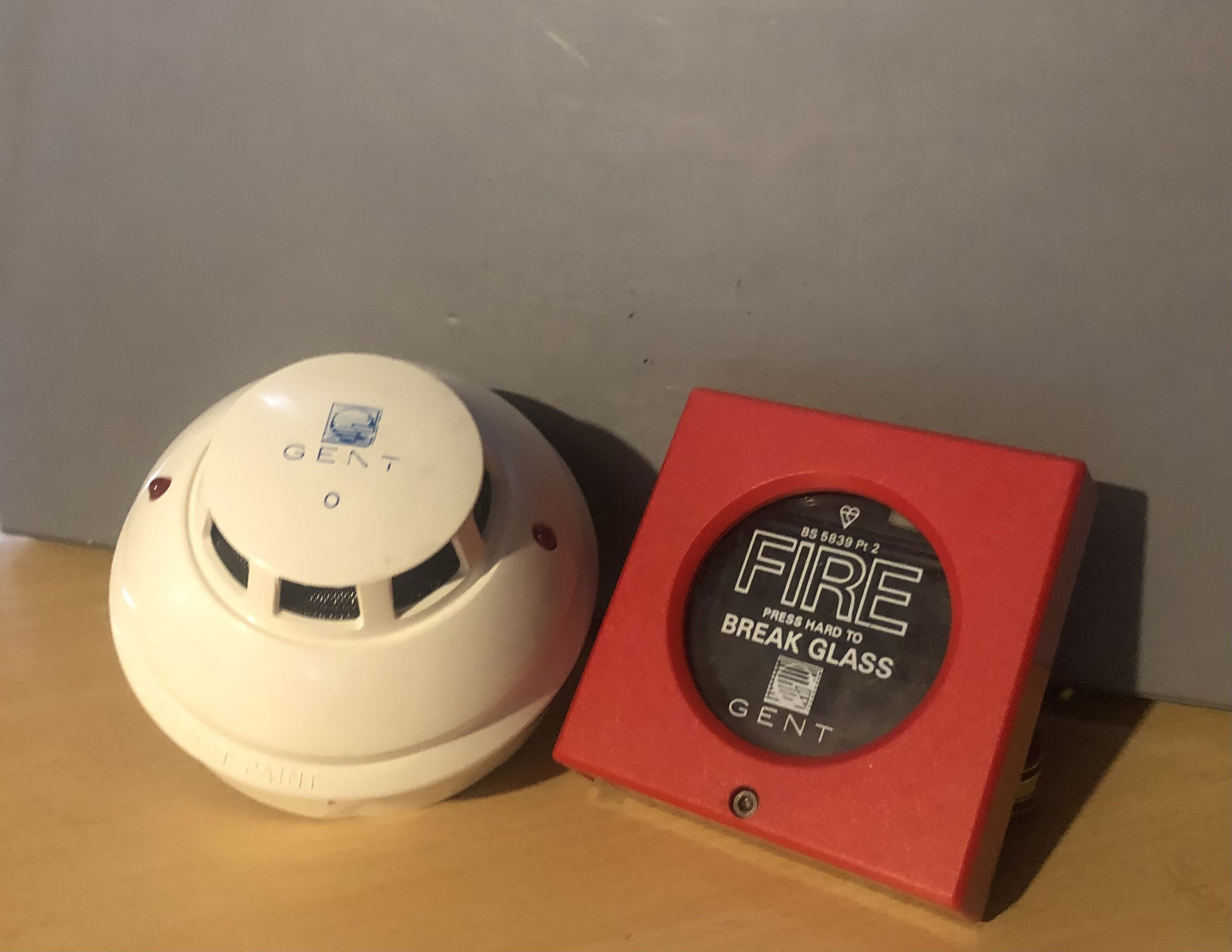
A Gent Conventional Optical Detector and Gent 1195 Call Point seen with the old non-compliant glass.

Since the late 20th century, Gent has continued to build upon its conventional offering. Conventional products released by Gent include the Xenex control panels, C3 conventional sounders, which were available with voice, and the 17800 detector range (consisting of the 17830 Ionisation Smoke Detector, 17840 Optical Smoke Detector, 17850 Fixed Rate Heat Detector, 17860 Rate of Rise Heat Detector, and 17870 High Heat Detector). The C3 range was never re-released with an EN54 VAD, unlike its S3 counterpart, instead being discontinued. Later Gent conventional systems used KAC call points as well as KAC ENscape sounders, replacing the 1195 call point design and C3 range of conventional sounders. EN54 compliant glass with a white background was also made available to replace the non-compliant transparent design on both conventional and addressable systems.

The latest range of conventional detectors is the ES Detect range which replaced the previous VISION detectors. The ES Detect range has a similar appearance to the addressable S-Quad, and the same detection technology as the Plexus detector series.

=== Wireless Fire Systems ===
==== Plexus ====
During the early 21st Century and continued development of Vigilon, Gent released a new range of hybrid wireless products – Plexus. Plexus used mesh networking technology with a loop-powered transceiver allowing addressable loops to be extended with wireless sensors, sounders and manual call points. Plexus installs are less common than their wired counterparts with one notable installation being the entrance to Norwich Station.

Gent has discontinued the replacement purchase of Plexus parts. It is unknown as to why, but currently replacing a Plexus device involves either using a used part, new-old stock, wiring a new, S-Quad or S-Cubed device, or replacing the wireless technology or fire system as a whole.

== Sphere Marketing Services (SMS) ==
Sphere Marketing Services (SMS) was established in the 1980s as a subsidiary of Gent. The company sold Gent products under the SMS brand name using different marketing strategies. Today, SMS continues to sell current Gent products via distributors, although the criteria to become a distributor is less strict. Modern SMS products have minor differences to their Gent Counterparts such as devices having their polling LEDs enabled by default, a lack of voice on all sounder devices, and missing Gent/Gent by Honeywell branding.

== Location ==
Its main design and manufacturing centre and headquarters were at the Faraday Works in Temple Road, Leicester; but after World War II, the company expanded into nearby Kibworth. A premises at London Road was also used at this time. In the early 1990s a new large building was constructed in the Hamilton area of Leicester and the other buildings were all closed. By February 1991, the company had finished moving to the new premises.

In January 2022, Gent moved to a new premises in Carlton Park, Leicester. The Waterside Road premises was closed and put up for sale, and later demolished.

== Takeovers ==
In 1975, Gents' of Leicester was taken over by the international organisation Chloride, and was known as 'Chloride Gent'. In July 1983, the company was sold by Chloride to the MK Electric Group, becoming 'Gent Limited'. The factory at Kibworth closed, and only a few jobs remained at the central Leicester works. In 1993, the company was acquired by Caradon/Novar.

In 2005, the company was acquired by Honeywell, and has been known as 'Gent by Honeywell' and, more recently, 'Honeywell Gent'. The company is legally known as Novar Systems Ltd. Still based in Leicester, the company is now mostly involved with fire detection and alarm systems.
