= Pittway =

American corporation

Pittway Corporation
- Formerly: Pittsburgh Street Railways Co.; Pittsburg Railways Co.
- Type: Public
- Fate: Acquired by Honeywell
- Number of locations: 8 manufacturing facilities (1999)
- Revenue: ▲US$48.9 million (1967); (?) US$39.4 million (1966)
- Net income: ▲US$5.8 million (1967); (?) US$4.4 million (1966)
- Owner: Standard Shares (40% in 1968)
- Number of employees: 7,600 (1999)
- Subsidiaries: B.R.K Electronics

Pittway Corporation was a diversified holding company best known as a manufacturer and distributor of professional and consumer fire and burglar alarms.

In 1962, Neison Harris became president, after having worked as an executive at Gillette, at a time when the company was transitioning from a trolley operating company to a diversified concern running multiple businesses. Pittway completed its divestment out transportation in 1964 through sale of Pittsburgh Railways to the Port Authority of Allegheny County, receiving more than US$16 million for the operations. (Note: The phrase used in the source is "...Port Authority Transit took over its people-carrying business in a condemnation proceeding...." That would seem to imply that the divestment was involuntary, but need better citation to get a clearer picture.) The demise of the trolley operations could likely be attributed to the rise in personal car purchases.

Neison Harris' brother, Irving B. Harris, also played a significant part in the company. Leo Guthart was previously the company's vice-chairman.

Among the company's acquisitions in the 1960s were Barr-Stalfort Co., an aerosol cans filler company, Alarm Device Manufacturing Co., and Industrial Publishing Co.

It relocated its headquarters to Chicago in 1967. In 1967, the company was renamed to Pittway Corporation. Later, Pittway became best known as a manufacturer and distributor of the First Alert brand of home smoke alarms, professional fire and burglar alarms, and other security systems, and as a real estate firm. It also owned the fire alarm companies Fire-Lite and Notifier.

By 1968, the company's vice-chairman was C. D. Palmer, who was also the senior executive based in the company's former home town of Pittsburgh.

In 1976, Pittway acquired Penton and merged Industrial Publishing into Penton. In the 1970s, specifically in 1977, Pittway and General Electric were the dominant consumer smoke alarm manufacturers. At that time, Pittway units were distributed by Sears. In 1978, the Consumer Product Safety Commission assessed a US$100,000 fine against Pittway for selling smoke detectors which were themselves fire hazards.

In 1998, Pittway spun off Penton as an independent company. Proposed in December 1999 and completed in February 2000, Honeywell acquired Pittway for US$2.2 billion as a play to expand the breadth of their business in its home and building control unit.
