= System Sensor =

Manufacturer of fire protection equipment

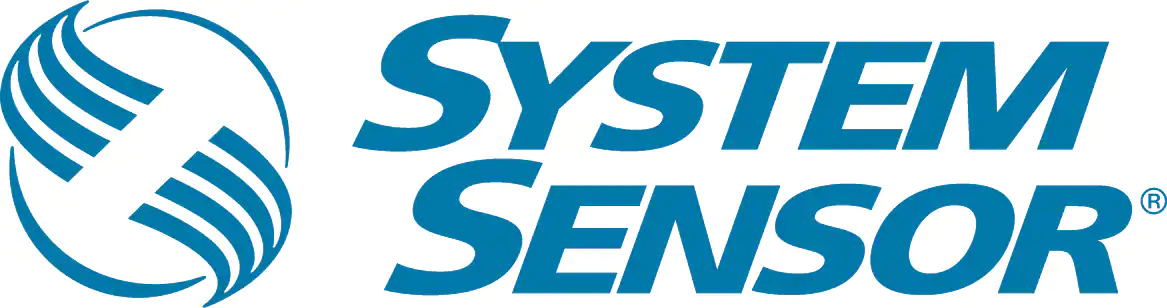
- Company type: Subsidiary
- Industry: Manufacturing
- Founded: 1984
- Headquarters: St. Charles, Illinois, US
- Area served: Worldwide
- Key people: John Hakanson, President
- Products: Fire detection and notification devices
- Number of employees: 1,900
- Parent: Honeywell International
- Website: buildings.honeywell.com/us/en/brands/our-brands/system-sensor

System Sensor is an American manufacturer of fire protection equipment. Headquartered in St. Charles, Illinois, System Sensor is a subsidiary of Honeywell International. System Sensor develops and distributes fire alarm devices such as notification appliances, fire detectors, manual initiating devices (pull stations and call points), CO detectors, and more fire protection devices for multiple markets across the globe, and for other Honeywell companies.

== History ==
System Sensor was founded in 1984 to address the requirements of exclusive industry fire alarm products.

Late 1980s: The company introduced the Multi-Alert Sounder Series (MASS), a line of multi-tone notification appliances.

== Products ==
=== Notification appliances ===
==== MASS Series ====
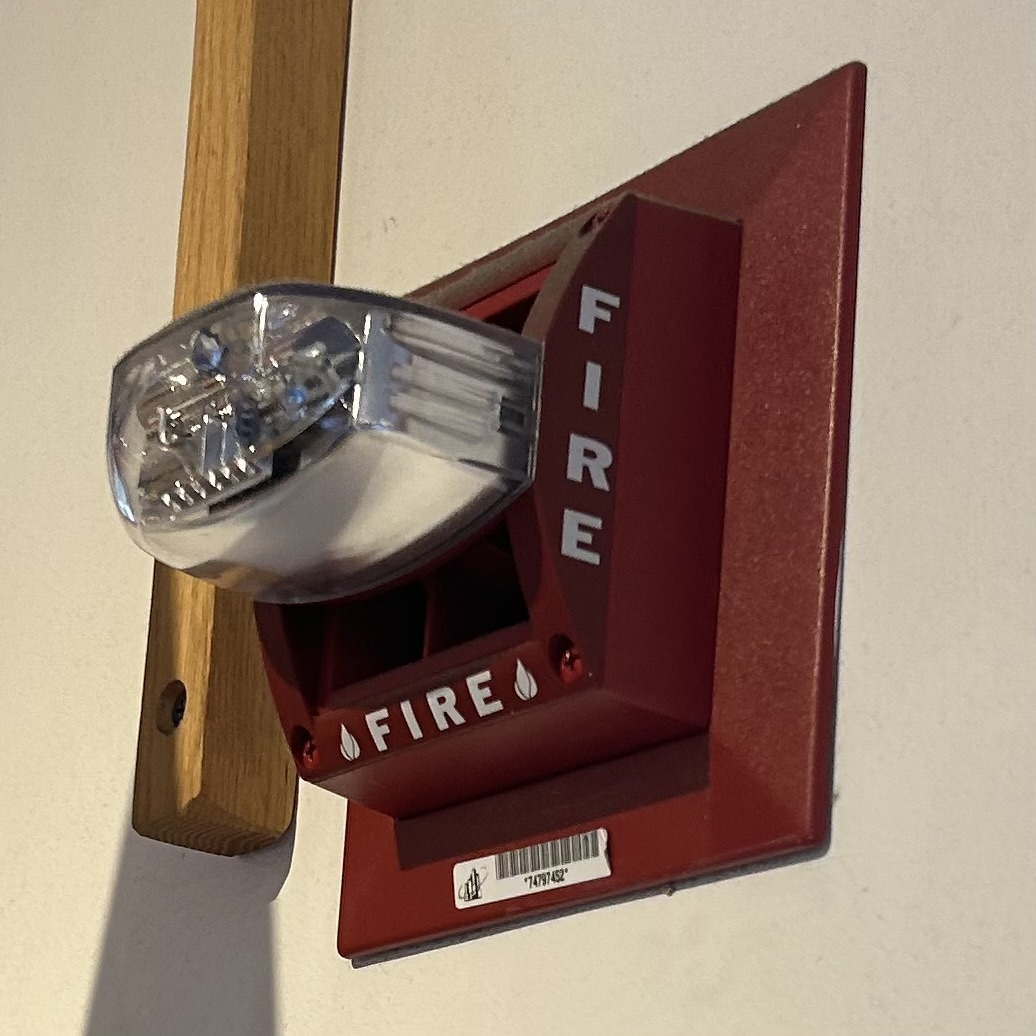
An ADA compliant version of the MASS

The MASS was multi-tone and came in remote horn and horn strobe models as well as remote strobe models, and speaker strobes and remote speakers. The MASS series was originally sold under BRK Electronics and later under System Sensor. It featured a xenon flash tube housed under a translucent white plastic. The original MASS series used break off tabs to change the tone meaning that once the tone is changed, it is permanent. The MASS series was later on updated to use jumpers rather than break off tabs.

In 1993, System Sensor filed a patent for a new strobe that was ADA compliant. It featured a clear lens and a reflector to distribute the light as well as higher candela options, the minimum being 15 candela. Soon after, System Sensor implemented the ADA-compliant strobe. In 1997, the MASS was replaced by the SpectrAlert series.

==== PA400 Series ====
The System Sensor PA400 was a mini horn, with an optional strobe attachment. In 2007, the PA400 series was discontinued and replaced with the MH series sold under the SpectrAlert Advance name.

==== SpectrAlert Series ====
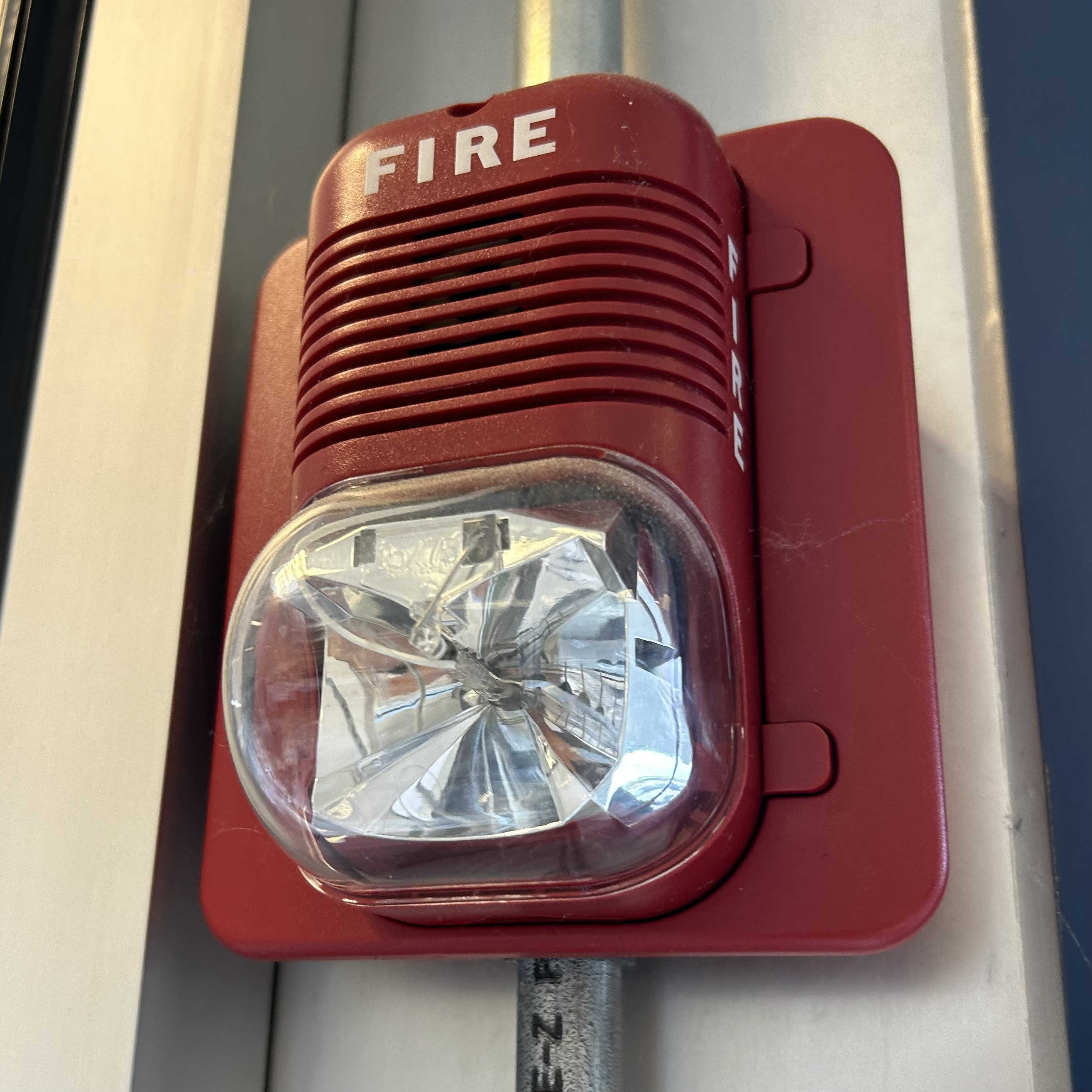
A SpectrAlert horn strobe

The SpectrAlert series was the successor to the MASS series. The SpectrAlert series included horn strobes, strobes, remote horns, chimes, chime strobes, speakers, and speaker strobes. A main feature of these alarms was the ability to sync them using a System Sensor MDL sync module or the System Sensor sync protocol on a supported fire alarm control panel. Three years after the initial release of the SpectrAlert series, System Sensor released the ceiling mount SpectrAlerts. This included horn strobes, remote strobes, speaker strobes, and remote speakers. There were multiple generations of the SpectrAlert. The first generation had a screw lock. The second generation, released in the early 2000s, replaced the screw lock with a clip lock. In 2003, the third generation was released with multi-candela strobes, and replaced the jumpers for the horn tone with DIP switches.

A few years after the discontinuation of the SpectrAlert series, fire alarm enthusiasts dubbed the SpectrAlert series as "SpectrAlert Classic" indicating that it is the original SpectrAlert line of fire alarm products. The term became popular and is now being used by most fire alarm enthusiasts today.

==== SpectrAlert Advance Series ====
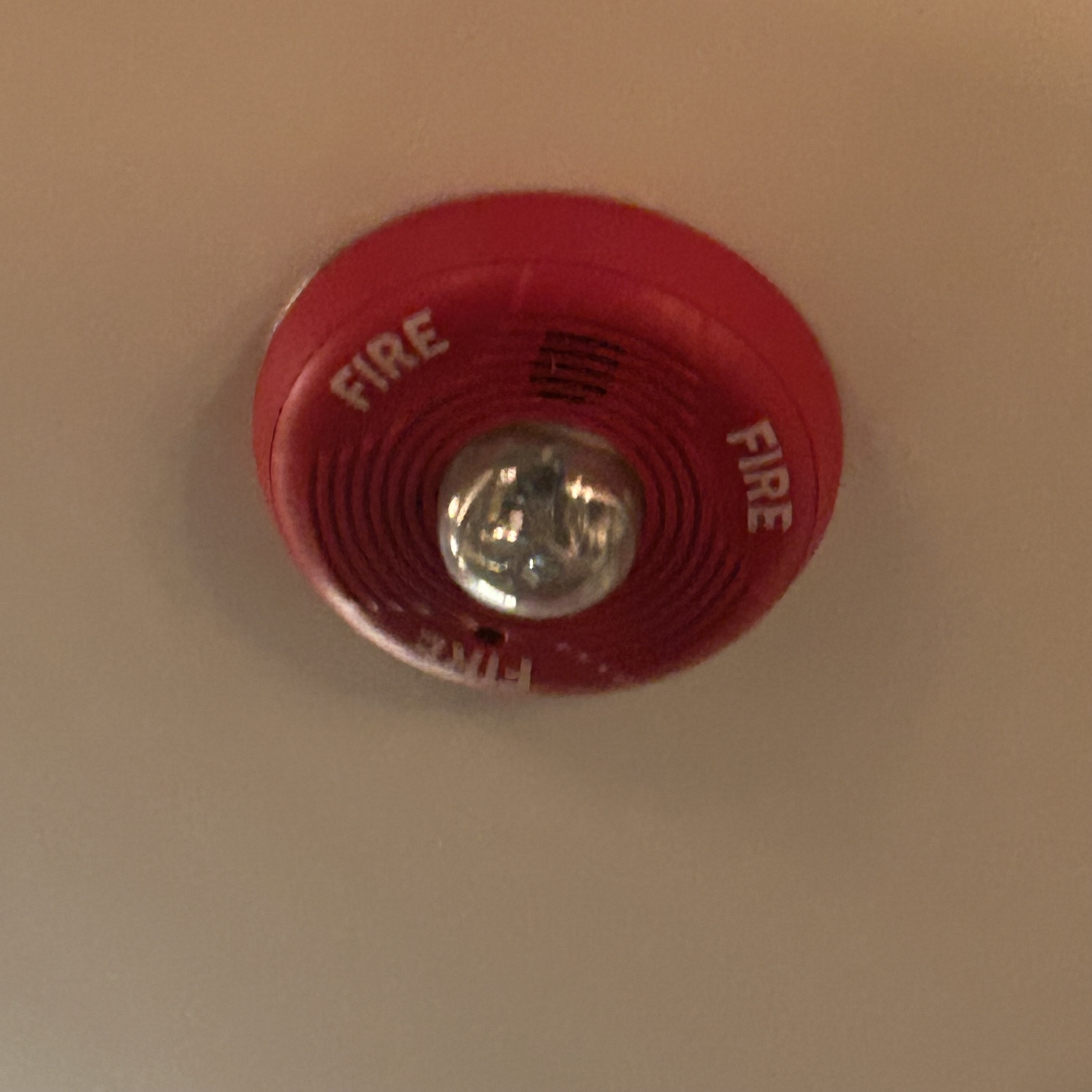
A SpectrAlert Advance ceiling mount horn strobe

The SpectrAlert Advance was introduced in 2006 to replace the Legacy SpectrAlerts. Its main features were an updated mounting plate wiring design that allows for easier installation, contains more candela options, and has an updated design. The Advance came in the same models as the original SpectrAlert, with the addition of mini horns, and low frequency sounders, which were released in 2014.

All SpectrAlert Advance products, except for the outdoor models and mini horns, were discontinued by February 12, 2020.

==== L-Series ====
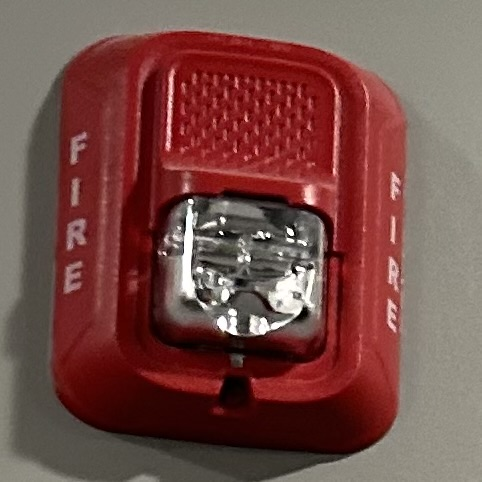
An L-Series remote strobe

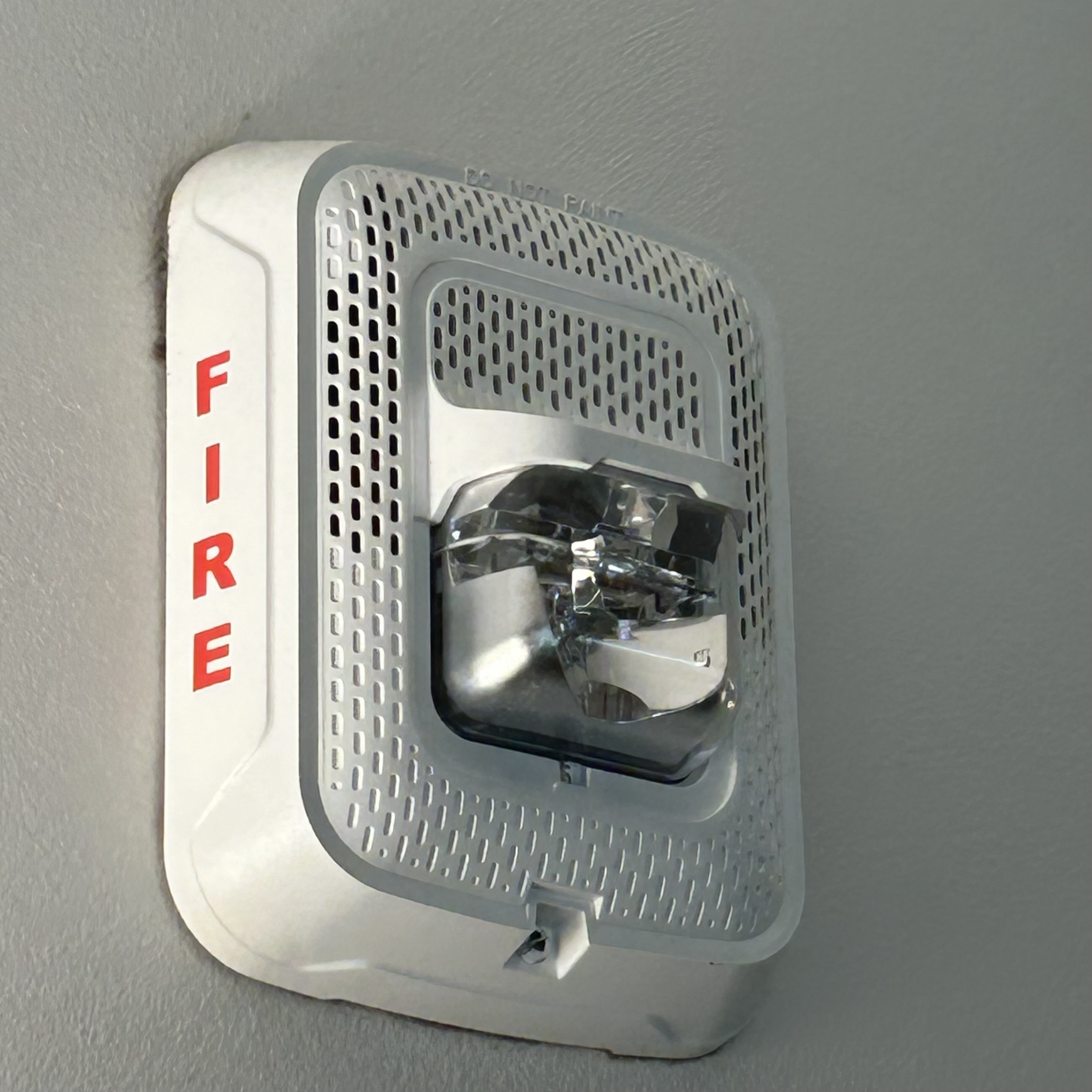
L-Series speaker strobe

In 2017, the System Sensor L-Series was released, replacing the SpectrAlert Advance series. New features included a new 3000 hertz tone, more candela options, lower power draw, and an updated design. The low frequency devices were released in 2018 and have a temporal 4 coding for carbon monoxide detection. On November 19, 2020, System Sensor released two new ceiling-mount low frequency sounder devices.

As of December 15, 2023, the xenon L-Series devices were discontinued in favor of their LED equivalents.

On March 14, 2024, some L-Series low frequency sounders have been recalled due to potential for low volume or no sound output.

==== LED L-Series ====
In October 2023, System Sensor announced the release of a new LED L-Series that uses lower current draw to replace the xenon L-Series devices.

=== Detection devices ===
==== 1400/2400 Series ====
In the 1990s System Sensor introduced a line of smoke detectors including the System Sensor 1400 2-wire Ionization detector and the 2400 2-wire Photoelectric detector.

==== i3 Series ====
In the 2000s, System Sensor introduced the i3 line of smoke detectors, which came in 2 and 4 wire models. These devices have a feature which they will poll with the fire alarm panel when the sensor is dirty, causing a trouble condition on the panel.

== See also ==
- Heat detector
- Notifier
- Fire-Lite Alarms
- Wheelock
