= Fire-Lite Alarms =

American manufacturer of fire protection equipment

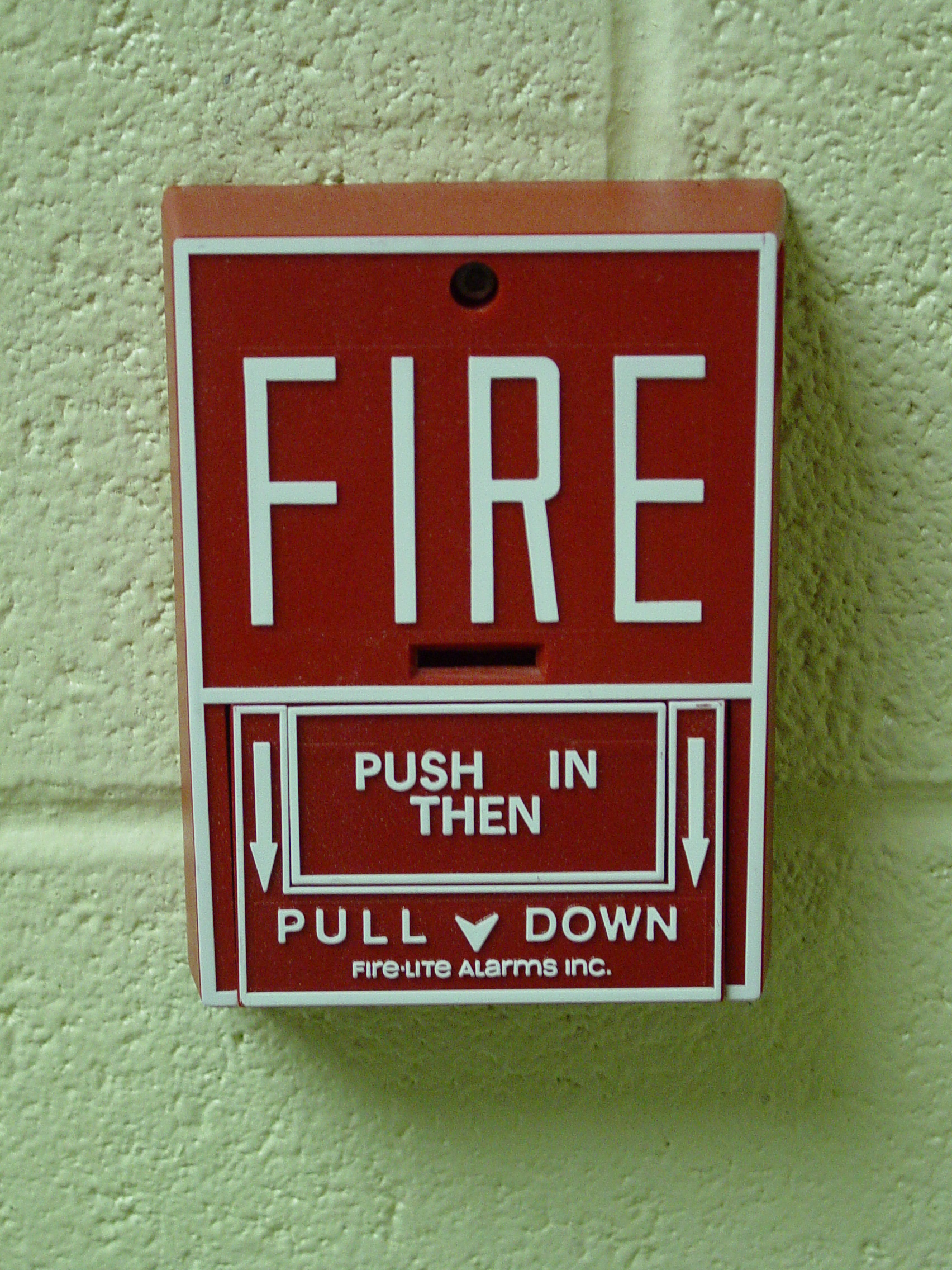
- BG-10 (above) and BG-12 (below) manual pull stations
- Industry: Fire alarm manufacturing
- Founded: 1940s
- Founder: Edward and Herbert Levy
- Headquarters: Northford, Connecticut, USA
- Products: Fire-Lite BG-10 pull station, BG-12 pull station, ES series fire alarm control panels, MS series fire alarm control panels
- Owner: Honeywell
- Parent: Honeywell Life Safety Group
- Website: buildings.honeywell.com/us/en/brands/our-brands/firelite

Fire-Lite Alarms is an American company owned by Honeywell and based in Northford, Connecticut. Fire-Lite manufactures fire alarm control panels (FACPs), EVAC (emergency voice and alarm communicator) panels, manual pull stations, digital alarm communicators, and annunciators.

Fire-Lite was founded in 1952 by Edward Levy, along with his son, Herbert. At the time, the company installed and serviced fire alarm systems. However, Levy began to focus on designing his own components, and in 1962, the company stopped installing and servicing systems. By 1973, the company had grown substantially, and moved into a new 50,000-square-foot (4,600 m^{2}) building. Fire-Lite was the first company to introduce a compact, inexpensive addressable fire alarm control panel. Some of their recognizable products include the Fire-Lite BG-10 pull station, introduced in 1983, and the newer BG-12 pull station, introduced in 1999. Fire-Lite is part of the Honeywell Life Safety Group, along with Notifier.

== See also ==
- Notifier
- System Sensor
- Fire alarm system
