= Leo Guthart =

American economist and businessman

- Education: Harvard College; Harvard Business School
- Occupations: Economist, businessman
- Employer(s): ADEMCO; Pittway Corporation
- Known for: Co-founding Long Island Venture Fund and Topspin Partners
- Awards: Long Island Technology Hall of Fame (2010)

Leo Guthart is an American economist and businessman. Guthart is a former Vice Chairman of the Pittway Corporation, and co-founder of the Long Island Research Institute, Topspin Partners, and the Long Island Venture Fund.

== Education ==
Leo Guthart graduated from Harvard College with a BA degree in physics in 1958. He later attended Harvard Business School, where he received both an MBA in 1960 and later a Doctorate in Business Administration. As a writer, his work has appeared in textbooks, including Financial Management; Cases and Readings by Pearson Hunt and Victor Andrews.

== Career ==
Leo Guthart's research as a doctoral candidate at Harvard Business School found that companies were repurchasing larger amounts of their own stock than had generally been realized, determining that these purchases had become a previously underappreciated factor in the stock market, tracking the trend from 1954 to 1963. He also wrote in 1965 that the practice would become more widespread. Guthart joined ADEMCO in 1963, which grew to the world's largest manufacturer of security and alarm devices by 1992, under the leadership of Guthart. He then served as Vice Chairman of Pittway Corporation and chief executive officer of its Security Group of Companies, including ADEMCO, until its sale to Honeywell in 2000. Simon Hakim and Erwin Blackstone wrote of Guthart's role that ADEMCO's “success” over the years, “can be attributed to Leo Guthart, [his] innovative behavior and willingness to take risks”. Guthart has also worked with technology transfer, focusing on commercializing the scientific work of research organizations. He also co-founded the Long Island Research Institute, alongside the Brookhaven National Laboratory, Cold Spring Harbor Laboratory, North Shore University Hospital, and Stony Brook University. In 1993 Guthart co-founded the Long Island Venture Fund with James Simons, and in 2000 he and Simons formed Topspin Partners, LP. Guthart is currently Vice Chairman of Accelerate Long Island. Guthart has also served as the Chairman of the Cylink Corporation.

== Personal life ==
Guthart was elected chairman of the Board of Trustees of Hofstra University in 1993 and is currently a member of the Hofstra Board of Trustees. In 2021, Hofstra University announced that a business school building on its campus will be known as the Leo A. Guthart Hall for Innovation and Discovery. Guthart is also the Treasurer and serves on the executive committee of the Cold Spring Harbor Laboratory, whose campus complex features the Laurie and Leo Guthart Discovery Tower in honor of his late wife. Guthart also established the Laurie Carrol Guthart Professorship in Medicine in the Field of Neuroendocrinology at Harvard Medical School. In 2010, Guthart was inducted into the Long Island Technology Hall of Fame.
