= Notifier =

Fire alarm systems manufacturer

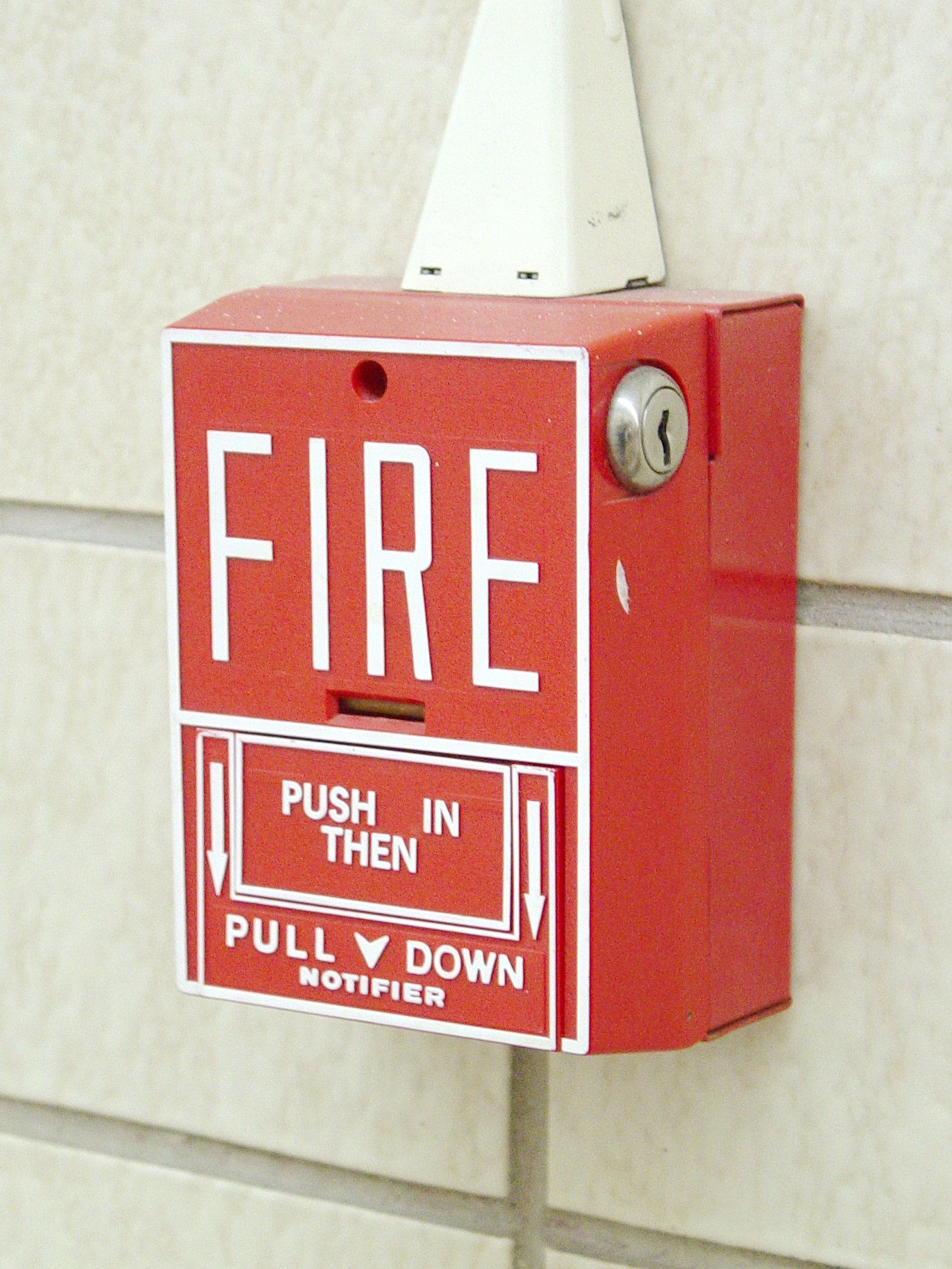
Notifier NBG-10L pull station

Notifier or Notifier by Honeywell is a manufacturer of engineered fire alarm systems with over 500 distributors worldwide, and regional support operations on every continent. Notifier is headquartered in Northford, Connecticut, United States, and is a division of the Honeywell Life Safety Group.

== History ==
Notifier was founded in 1949 in Waverly, Nebraska by Oliver T. Joy, along with his wife Dr. Margaret Joy, who acted as executive Vice President. The company moved to Lincoln, Nebraska in 1956, and in 1962 was selected to provide the fire detection system for the Seattle World's Fair. The company was sold to Emhart Corporation in 1968 and was acquired by the Pittway Corporation in 1987. Notifier moved to Northford, Connecticut in 1988, and in 1999 Honeywell International, Inc. purchased Pittway Corp., and Notifier became part of the Honeywell Life Safety Group.

== See also ==
- Fire alarm
- System Sensor
- Fire alarm control panel
