= Window insulation =

Methods of reducing heat transfer through a window

Window insulation reduces heat transfer from one side of a window to the other. The U-value is used to refer to the amount of heat that can pass through a window, called thermal transmittance, with a lower score being better. The U-factor of a window can often be found on the rating label of the window.

== U-value ==
Although the concept of U-value (or U-factor) is universal, U-values can be expressed in different units. In most countries, U-value is expressed in SI units, as watts per square metre-kelvin:

W/(m^{2}⋅K)

In the United States, U-value is expressed as British thermal units (Btu) per hour-square feet-degrees Fahrenheit:

Btu/(h⋅ft^{2}⋅°F)

Within this article, U-values are expressed in SI unless otherwise noted. To convert from SI to US customary values, divide by 5.678.

Most governments in several countries offer tax breaks or rebate to promote installation of energy savings systems (windows, boilers, insulation, etc.)

== Energy Efficient Technologies ==
Below is a list of technologies that decrease heat transfer in windows:

=== Double- and triple-glazed windows ===
- Clear single glass has a U-factor around 5.7 W/(m^{2}⋅K) or 1 Btu/(h⋅ft^{2}⋅°F) (R-1)
- Clear double glazing has a U-factor between 1.8 and 3 W/(m^{2}⋅K) or between 0.3 and 0.5 Btu/(h⋅ft^{2}⋅°F) (about R-2)
- Clear triple glazing has a U-factor between 0.5 and 1 W/(m^{2}⋅K) or between 0.1 and 0.2 Btu/(h⋅ft^{2}⋅°F) (about R-3).

Double and triple glazing are critical for energy efficiency. Single glass windows are no longer in general use.

The insulation provided by double or triple glazing can be further improved by selecting windows with low-e coatings, thermal breaks and argon or other similar gas between the panes, and also by selecting windows with high energy-efficient frames.

=== Low-e coatings ===
Modern double, triple and quadruple-glazed windows have thin, metallic low-e coatings on the panes, which can significantly improve their thermal insulating performance.

Another area where low-e coatings are used is thermal barriers. Some thermal barriers (like Insulbar LEF) decrease thermal losses due to radiation through a low-e folio applied to the thermal insulation profile.

=== Thermal insulation profiles ===
To reduce heat flow and the U-factor, metal frames should have an insulating plastic profile placed between the inside and outside of the frame and sash. These profiles are called thermal breaks and are made from glass fibre reinforced polyamide 6,6. The proportion of glass fibre in the profiles is 25%. The material used for this insulating bar stands out for its low thermal conductivity value (0.30 W/m2K) and its good mechanical properties even at higher temperatures.

A non-thermally-separated frame from an aluminum window has a thermal transmission coefficient of 6.8 W/m2K. If the system is thermally separated with an insulating profile with a width of 42 mm, the thermal transmission coefficient can be reduced to 1.3 W/m2K.

Insulbar LO, a product introduced by Ensinger, is a lambda (thermal conductivity) optimized solution for thermal insulation profiles. Its lambda value is only 0.18 W/m2K.

=== Warm edge spacers ===
Most modern windows use glazing spacers to keep the distance between their panes for sealing purposes. Many of these spacers are made from aluminum, which is a very conductive material. There is a better alternative for higher insulation performance: special plastic spacers, generally referred to as 'warm-edge spacers'.

=== Inert gas fills ===
Double and triple-glazed windows also have argon, krypton, or other inert gases between their panes. It is another key element for a better thermal insulation.

Most windows use argon (which is cheaper), but krypton is a better choice of insulation when the distance between the panes has to be smaller (the distance has to be about 13 mm (1/2 inch) for argon, and about 9 mm (3/8 inch) for krypton; increasing or decreasing the space will degrade performance).

=== Specialized Window frames ===
The type of window frame and the insulation of its cavity are critical for energy-efficiency and thermal performance (and for strength, durability and maintenance).

Aluminum frames are excellent for strength, durability and maintenance but they are a poor choice for thermal insulation. Aluminum is an extremely conductive material. Therefore, thermal insulation profiles are used to create a thermal separation of the inner and outer shells of metal frames. The variety of thermal insulation profiles (Insulbar) allows low U_{f} values (for example 1.3 W/m^{2}K by using a 34mm insulation profile and up to 1.1 W/m^{2}K with contemporary aluminum systems) to be reached. Polyamide insulation profiles with 25% glass fibre content are the best commercially available choice for optimum heat insulation and mechanical properties.

Wood frame windows provide better insulation, but they are a poor choice for durability or maintenance (unless you choose wood-clad windows).

Vinyl and fiberglass are better insulation and noise reduction materials. Certain windows have vinyl or fiberglass frames that feature chambers, to further enhance insulation and noise reduction.

=== High insulation-performance windows ===
Energy-efficient houses in cold climates often feature triple-glazed windows with a U-value between 0.19 and 0.26. In moderate and hot climates, quality double-glazed windows with a U-value of about 0.30 are generally a more cost-competitive and effective choice.

=== Other ways of improving the insulation of a window ===
1. Using glass with heat reflective properties
2. Sticking on thermal reflective plastic
3. Double glazing using heat-shrink plastic film and double sided tape

The frame used can also be significant, especially if they are made from a high thermal conductivity material such as metal. In this case, plastic spacers should be used to create thermal breaks between the inner and outer sections of the frame.

== See also ==
- Insulated glazing
- Quadruple glazing
- Window film
- Window insulation film
