= Roof lantern =

Architectural element

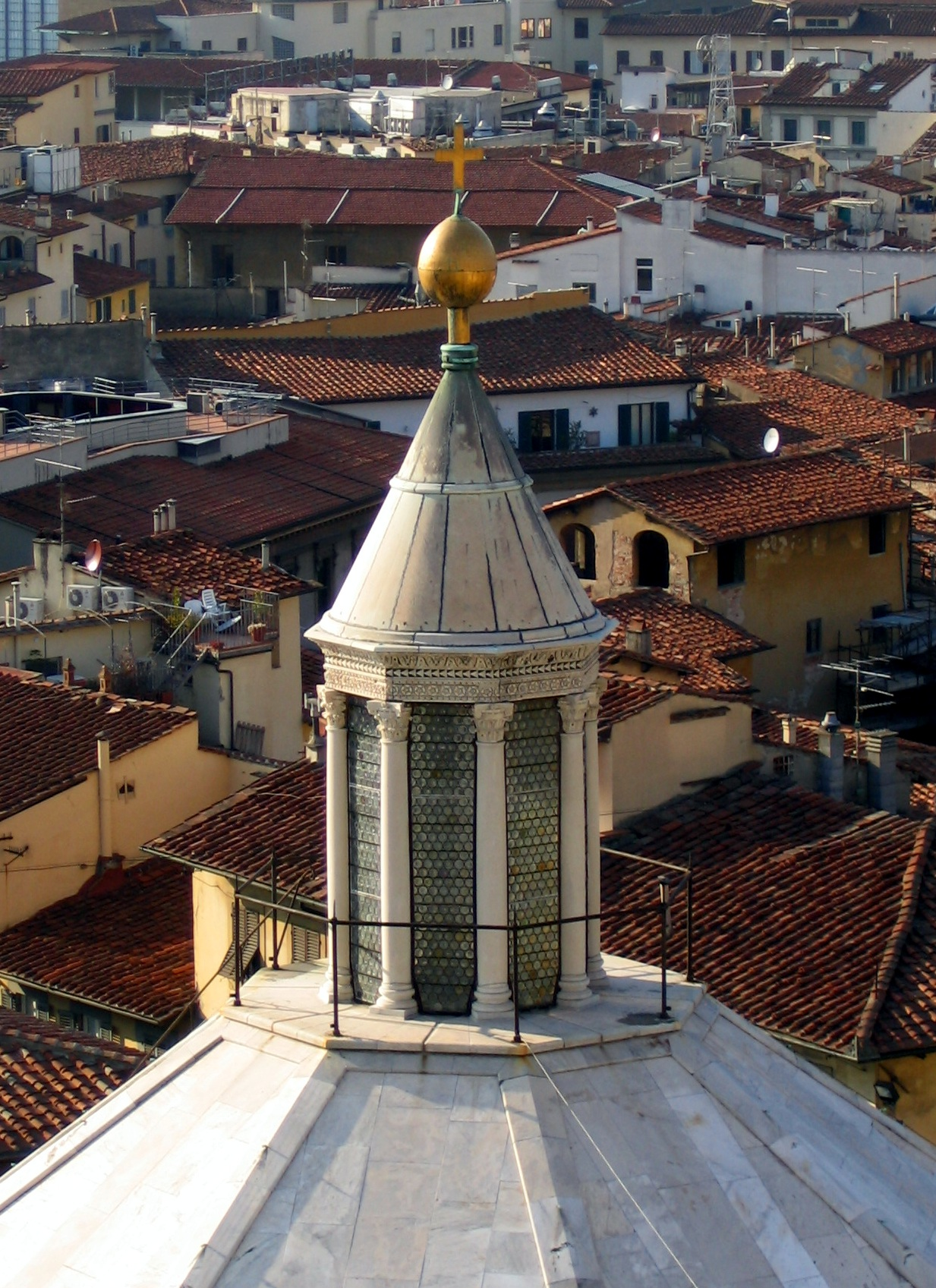
The lantern over the dome of the Florence Baptistery, dated to 1150

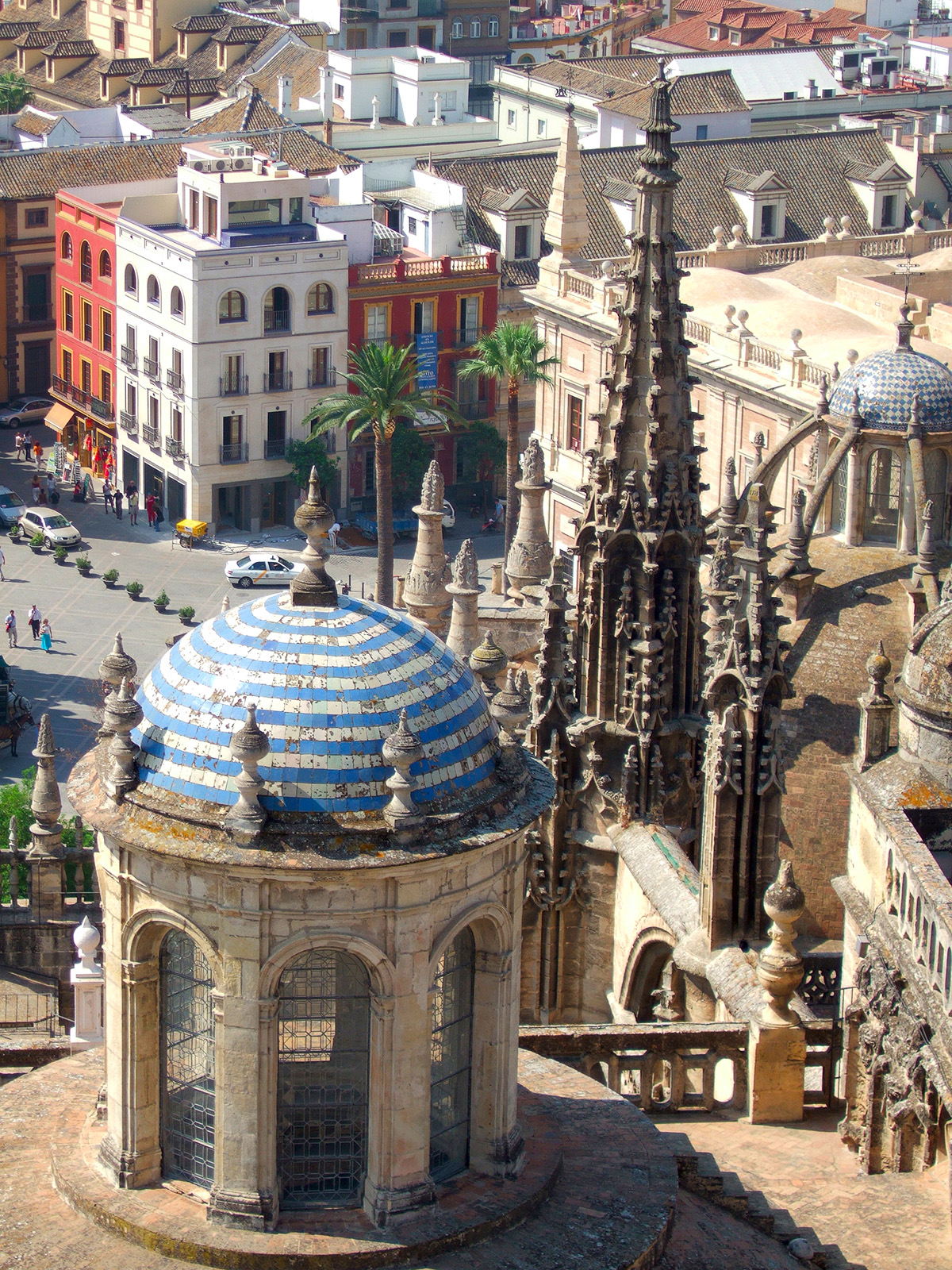
A cupola-shaped lantern on 16th-century Seville Cathedral, Andalusia, Spain

A roof lantern is a daylighting architectural element. Architectural lanterns are part of a larger roof and provide natural light into the space or room below. In contemporary use it is an architectural skylight structure.

A lantern roof will generally mean just the roof of a lantern structure in the West, but has a special meaning in Indian architecture (mostly Buddhist, and stretching into Central Asia and eastern China), where it means a dome-like roof raised by sets of four straight beams placed above each other, "arranged in diminishing squares", and rotated with each set. Normally such a "lantern" is enclosed and provides no light at all.

The term roof top lantern is sometimes used to describe the lamps on roofs of taxis in Japan, designed to reflect the cultural heritage of Japanese paper lanterns.

== History ==
The glazed lantern was developed during the Middle Ages, one notable medieval example being that atop the 14th-century Octagon Tower at Ely Cathedral in England. Roof lanterns of masonry and glass were used in Renaissance architecture, such as in principal cathedrals. In 16th-century France and Italy, they began usage in orangeries, an early form of a conservatory structure with tall windows and a glazed roof section for wintering citrus trees and other plants in non-temperate climates.

Post-Renaissance roof lanterns were made of timber and glass and were often prone to leaking.

Initially wood-framed in the 18th and 19th centuries, skylights became even more popular in metal construction with the advent of sheet-metal shops during the Victorian era. Virtually every urban row house of the late-19th and early-20th centuries relied upon a metal-framed skylight to illuminate its enclosed stairwell. More elaborate dwellings of the era showed a fondness for the roof lantern, in which the humble ceiling-window design of the skylight is elaborated into a miniature glass-paneled conservatory-style roof cupola or tower.

== Present day ==
Modern lanterns benefit from advances in glazing and sealing techniques, plus the development of high performance insulated glass and sealants, which reduce energy loss and provide water-tightness in the same manner as conventional skylights. Typically, roof lanterns are constructed using wood, UPVC or aluminium, or a combination of those materials.

They serve as an architectural feature, distinguished from commercial manufactured skylights by their custom design, providing unique views to the outdoors. Roof lanterns for residential homes are usually constructed using a combination of triangular and trapezoidal segments, fitted within a UPVC or aluminium frame. Traditional architectural styles characterise most roof lanterns in the UK. In the U.S., where the term 'custom' skylight is often used, modern styles of roof lanterns are also common in the building vernacular.

== Gallery ==
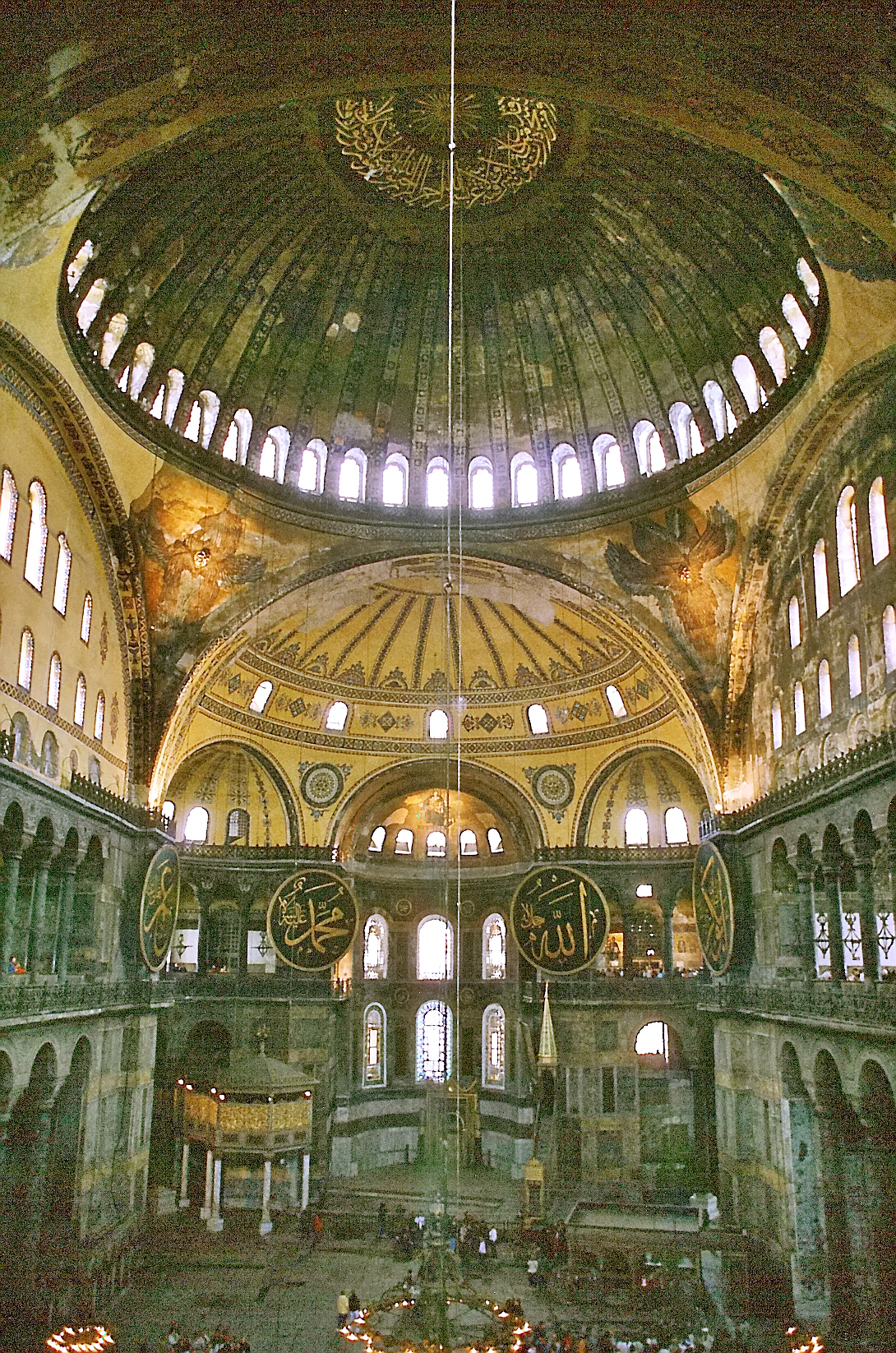
The 6th-century Hagia Sophia's upper dome acts as a roof lantern

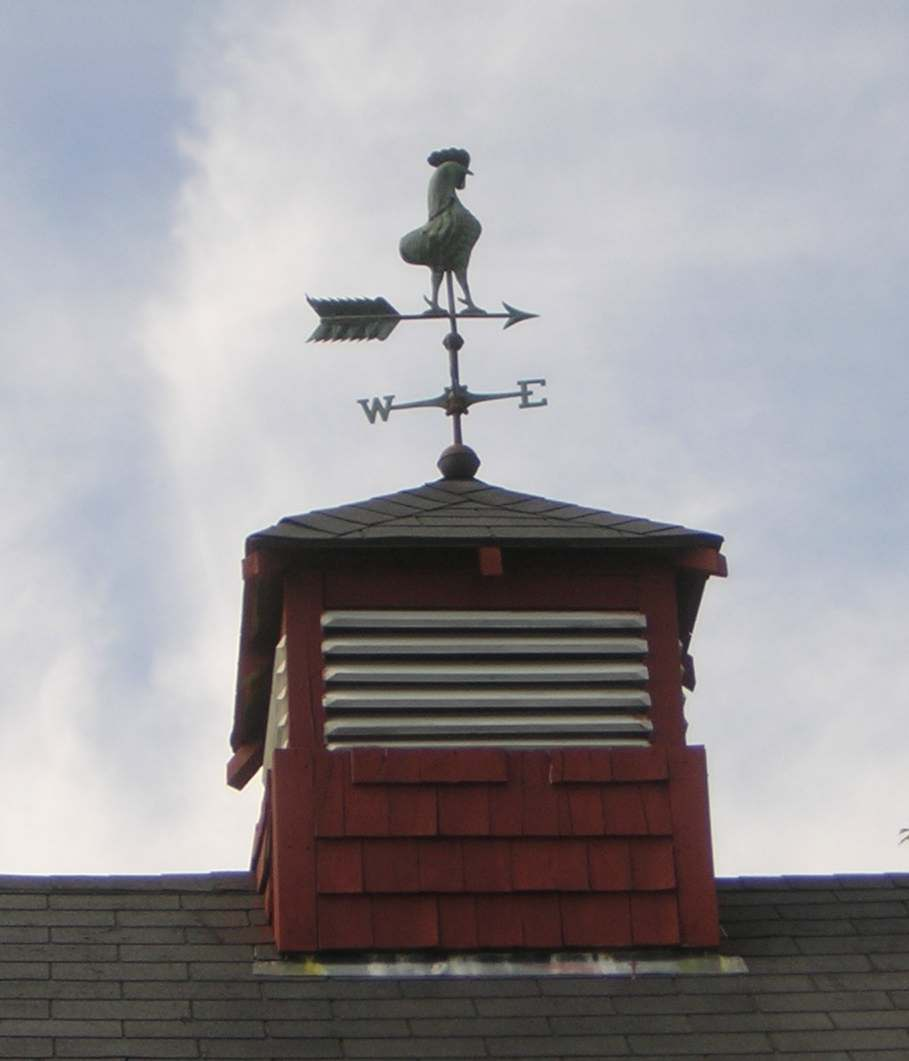
Roof lanterns were also used on some old barns for ventilation.

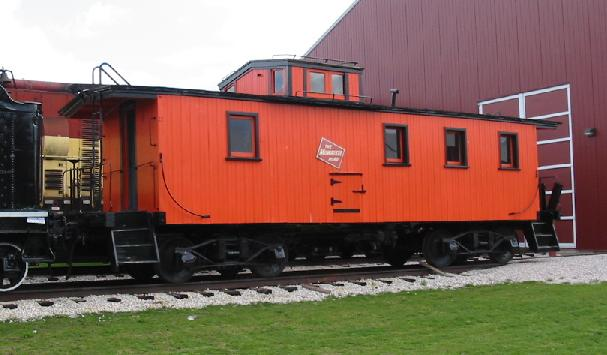
A cupola-style caboose with an "angel seat" above

== See also ==
- Chhatri
- Conservatory (greenhouse)
- Cupola
- Daylighting
- Passive daylighting
- Tholobate, a drum under a dome
