= Technoform =

German manufacturing company

- Company type: GmbH
- Industry: Chemistry
- Founded: 1969
- Headquarters: Kassel, Germany
- Key people: Matteo Dolcera; Guido Amedeo Faré; Christian Scheller
- Revenue: 298.50 million EUR (2025)
- Number of employees: 1400 (2026)

Technoform is a German manufacturing company headquartered in Kassel, Germany, with operations worldwide. The company specializes in the extrusion and pultrusion of thermoplastic profiles and employs 1,400 people worldwide.

== History ==
Technoform was founded in 1969 by Karl-Hans Caprano and Erwin Brunnhofer in Kassel. The family-run enterprise first began to manufacture technical extrusions from thermoplastics under the German-language tagline "Präzision in Kunststoff" (English: Precision in plastic). The first patent application for the PPZ I process developed by Technoform was filed in 1975.

In its early years, the company manufactured special profiles made from polystyrene, surface profiles made from ABS for skis, and running surface profiles from polyethylene. Over time, the company successively expanded its product portfolio, and, since the 1990s, has continually enlarged its production and sales capacities across various divisions. The company is now in its second generation, managed by family members of the original founders. It has a presence in major markets with its own dedicated production facilities or regional sales offices on nearly every continent.

A new production site for hybrid spacers for insulating glass was opened in Singapore in 2019, followed by another in Poland in 2023. In Belgium, production of insulating profiles started in 2025.

== Locations ==
Technoform is headquartered in Kassel, Hesse, Germany. The company is regarded as one of the region's larger employers. The German production sites are located in Kassel and Lohfelden. The company operates manufacturing facilities in Belgium, Italy, Spain, Poland, the United States, China, Hong Kong and Singapore. It also maintains sales offices in numerous countries worldwide, such as: Australia, Brazil, China, Germany, Estonia, Finland, France, Greece, India, Italy, Japan, Korea, Lithuania, New Zealand, Singapore, Spain, Taiwan, the Czech Republic, Turkey, the United Arab Emirates, the United Kingdom and the United States.

== Products ==
Technoform specializes in the extrusion of thermoplastic profiles.

The company manufactures insulating profiles for the thermal break of aluminum window, door and facade systems. Technoform offers hybrid warm edge spacers for insulating glass units, which are used in the insulating glass edge bond to improve thermal performance.

Technoform also supplies plastic profiles and components for various industries (including the automotive industry, electrical engineering and mechanical engineering). In addition, the product portfolio includes heat transfer solutions for industrial applications, such as flue-gas heat recovery and thermal water treatment. Technoform is also active in the field of thermoplastic pultrusion. The process enables the manufacture of fibre-reinforced plastic profiles that can achieve stiffness comparable to metallic materials at lower weight.
