= Ensinger (company) =

German plastics company

Ensinger GmbH
- Company type: GmbH
- Industry: Plastics processing
- Founded: 1966
- Founder: Wilfried Ensinger
- Headquarters: Nufringen, Germany
- Key people: Ralph Pernizsak (MD); Björn Schneekloth (MD)
- Products: Semi-finished engineering plastics, finished parts, profiles, compounds
- Revenue: 524,9 million EUR
- Number of employees: 2,767
- Website: ensingerplastics.com

The Ensinger Group is a manufacturer engaged in the development and manufacture of compounds, semi-finished products, technical parts, composite materials and profiles made of engineering and high-performance plastics. The family-owned enterprise is represented in major industrial regions with manufacturing facilities or sales offices. The main office is located in Nufringen/Baden-Württemberg, Germany.

== History ==
The Ensinger Group was founded in 1966 by Wilfried Ensinger. Initially, the company focussed on the manufacturing and sale of thermoplastic engineering plastics. Closely linked with this technology, the company worked on further development of the extrusion process and application technology. A short time after relocation of the headquarters to Nufringen, Ensinger expanded its production capabilities and began machining components from semi-finished products. In 1974, the company started developing heat-insulated precision profiles for metal window systems, and by the end of 1977, the company dispatched its first volume-produced thermal insulating profiles made of glass fibre-reinforced polyamide 6.6 to manufacturers of aluminium windows.

In 1980 a second plant was erected in Cham/Bavaria, facilitating the mass production of insulating profiles. In 1985, Ensinger added an injection molding division. The largest subsidiary of the Ensinger Group was established in 1986 in Washington, Pennsylvania, and in the subsequent years, Ensinger expanded internationally with branches in Europe, North America, South America and Asia.

The management of the company transitioned to the second generation in 1997. Ensinger began sales in China in 2002, and established its own production facility there in 2007. A third production site was opened in Germany in 2009 at Rottenburg-Ergenzingen, focussing on injection molding.

On 1 February 2022, it was announced Ensinger had concluded a joint agreement to acquire INEOS Styrolution's StyLight thermoplastic composite materials business.

In 2019, Ensinger divested its segment of insulating plastic spacers for insulating glass to the Fenzi Group.

== Business field ==
Ensinger's thermoplastic polymer products are utilised across a variety of industrial sectors, including mechanical engineering, automotive aviation, and medical technology. The company's technical solutions predominantly based on thermoplastic polymers, are also prevalent in the food industry as well as in electrical and semiconductor technologies. Often, these high -performance plastics are used as substitutes for traditional materials like metals or ceramics.

To process the thermoplastic polymers, Ensinger uses a number of production methods, in particular compounding, extrusion, machining, injection moulding, casting, sintering and compression molding.

The range of polymers processed by Ensinger includes engineering plastics such as polyamide (PA), polyethylene terephthalate (PET), and polyoxymethylene (POM), as well as a category of temperature-resistance-high-performance plastics such as polyether ether ketone (PEEK), polyphenylene sulfide (PPS), polysulfone (PSU), polyimide (PI), and polyimide aurum TPI.

The company's organisational structure is based on a matrix system, which is segmented into different business areas reflecting its product lines including:

Compounds: During the compounding process at Ensinger, plastic raw materials are melted and extruded into thin strands with various fillers or additives, and then cut into granules. This process tailors the properties of the plastics to meet the requirements of specific applications. Ensinger has developed a range of modified plastics through this method, including products that have enhanced sliding friction values and materials engineered to possess specific electrical properties.

Semi-finished Products: Traditionally the core of Ensinger's business, semi-finished products like extruded sheets, round rods, and hollow rods are prevalent in industries such as mechanical engineering. These materials are used to manufacture small quantities of technical parts such as bearings, bushings, levers, or gears. The semi-finished products can be simply cut or subjected to more complex processes like grinding, planing, or precise machining based on specific drawings. Ensinger primarily processes construction and high-performance plastics in this segment.

Injection-molded Finished Parts: The injection molding process at Ensinger facilitates the mass production of technical parts and assemblies using high-performance plastics. Examples include thrust washers, piston rings, and ball shells for the automotive industry, along with machine elements like bearings and gears. These materials are designed to be resistant to temperature fluctuations and exposure to fuels and oils. Injection-molded parts are also utilised in medical device technology and the aerospace industry.

Polyamide Casting (Semi-finished Products): This involves pressureless mold casting to create polyamide semi-finished and finished products.

Machined Finished Parts: Ensinger also crafts finished parts from semi-finished or injection-molded components through mechanical processes such as milling and turning. This technique is often used for small production runs of technical components and prototypes, including valve pistons and transmission levers.

Industrial Profiles and Pipes: Profiles and special pipes are manufactured using controlled extrusion processes, often reinforced with materials like carbon or aramid fibers or specialised friction-reducing additives to enhance durability under mechanical, thermal, or chemical stress. Techniques like coextrusion are employed to integrate reinforcing materials or combine plastics with different properties.

Thermal Insulation Profiles: Developed for window, door, and facade construction, these profiles create a thermal break between the inner and outer metal frames, aiding in energy cost reduction. In 2013, Ensinger pioneered an insulation profile made entirely from recycled polyamide.

Other Product Lines: Ensinger's portfolio includes compression-molded polyimide materials known for their durability and strength, suitable for temperatures ranging from -270°C to 300°C, with some materials capable of withstanding up to 470°C.

Furthermore, carbon fiber composites made from a PAEK-based polymer matrix (either PEEK or PEKK) embedded with carbon fibre are noted for their strength and heat resistance. These composites are primarily used in medical technology and orthopedics due to their biocompatibility and resistance to X-rays, steam, and chemicals.

== Locations ==
The company group employs a total workforce of more than 2,500 at over 30 locations.

=== Production sites ===
- Nufringen, Germany
- Cham, Germany
- Rottenburg-Ergenzingen, Germany
- Seewalchen, Austria
- Lenzing, Austria
- Otelfingen, Switzerland
- Beynost, France
- Olcella di Busto Garolfo, Italy
- Tonyrefail, Wales, UK
- Bridgwater, UK
- Rossendale, UK
- Washington, Pennsylvania, USA
- Grenloch, New Jersey, USA
- Greenwood, Delaware, USA
- Putnam, Connecticut, USA
- Houston, Texas, USA
- Huntersville, North Carolina, USA
- Sao Leopoldo, Rio Grande do Sul, Brazil
- Song Jiang, Shanghai, China
- Johor, Malaysia

The company also owns subsidiaries in Denmark, Poland, Sweden, Spain, Czech Republic, Turkey, Japan, Singapore, Vietnam, India, Taiwan and South Korea.

== See also ==
- LucaNet
- NetBeans
