= Dead air space =

Dead air space may refer to:

- Dead Air Space, a blog maintained by the members of the band Radiohead
- Unventilated air space, such as the space between panes of glass in insulated glazing
- No-fly zone: a territory or an area over which aircraft are not permitted to fly.
