= Glazing (window) =

Part of a wall or window, made of glass

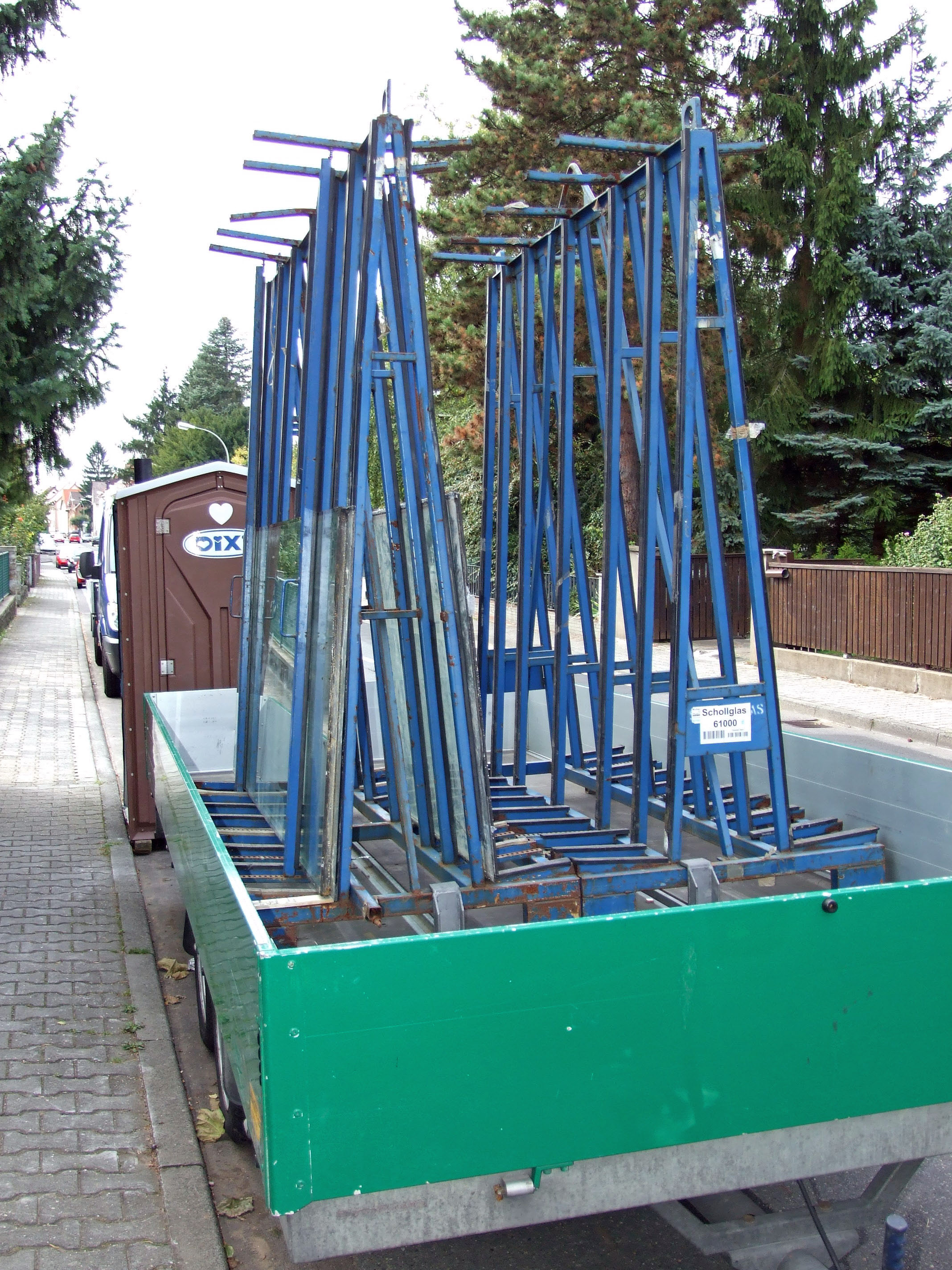
Pane transport rack

Glazing, which derives from the Middle English for 'glass', is a part of a wall or window, made of glass. Glazing also describes the work done by a professional "glazier". Glazing is also less commonly used to describe the insertion of ophthalmic lenses into an eyeglass frame.

Common types of glazing that are used in architectural applications include clear and tinted float glass, tempered glass, and laminated glass as well as a variety of coated glasses, all of which can be glazed singly or as double, or even triple, glazing units. Ordinary clear glass has a slight green tinge, but special colorless glasses are offered by several manufacturers.

Glazing can be mounted on the surface of a window sash or door stile, usually made of wood, aluminium or PVC. The glass is fixed into a rabbet (rebate) in the frame in a number of ways including triangular glazing points, putty, etc. Toughened and laminated glass can be glazed by bolting panes directly to a metal framework by bolts passing through drilled holes.

Glazing is commonly used in low temperature solar thermal collectors because it helps retain the collected heat.

== History ==
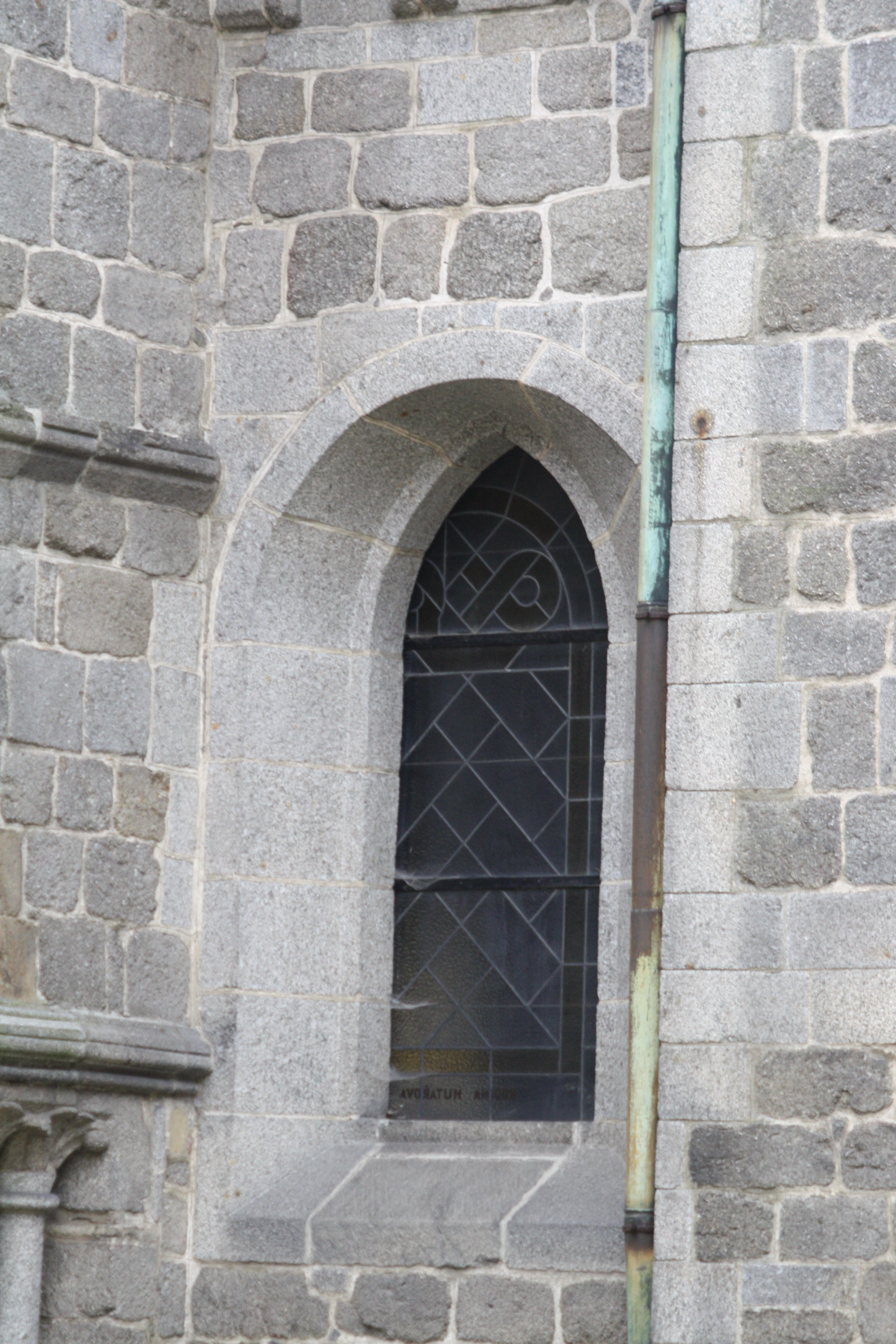
This window from a basilica in the Czech Republic, constructed in the 1200s, would have used the unrolled cylinder method of construction.

The first recorded use of glazing in windows was by the Romans in the first century AD. This glass was rudimentary, essentially a blown cylinder that had been flattened out, and was not very transparent. In the eleventh century, techniques were developed where the glass was spun into a disc, creating a thinner circular window, or a cylinder was again formed, but this time it was cut from edge to edge and unrolled to make a rectangle-shaped window. The newer cylinder method remained the dominant method until the 19th century, and individual panes of glass were therefore limited in size to the dimensions of those cylinders.

Continuous plate production was invented in 1848 by Henry Bessemer, who drew a ribbon of glass through rollers. This standardized the thickness of the glass, but its use in mass-production was limited by the need to polish both sides of the glass after manufacture, which was time-consuming and expensive. The process was slowly refined throughout the next century, with automated grinders and polishers being added to bring the cost down.

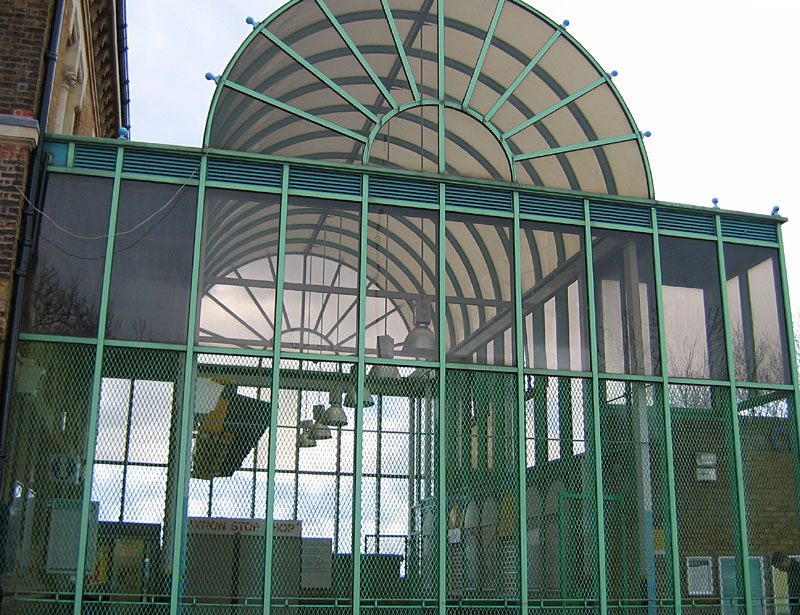
The large panes of glazing in this station are pieces of float glass.

The breakthrough in large, mass-produced, continuous glass production happened in the 1950s with the development of the float glass manufacturing process. Molten glass is poured over a surface of molten tin, where it flattens out and can be drawn off in a ribbon. The advantage of this process is that it is scalable to any size and produces high quality panes without any further polishing or grinding. Float glass has continued to be the most used type of glazing to the present day.

== Composition ==
The most common glass used for glazing is Soda–lime glass, which has many advantages over other glass types. Silica (SiO_{2}) makes up the bulk of the composition of this material at 70–75% by weight. Pure silica has a melting point that would be prohibitively expensive to reach with large-scale manufacturing, so sodium oxide (soda, Na_{2}O) is added, which reduces the melting point. However, the sodium ions are water-soluble, which is not a desired property, so calcium oxide (lime, CaO) is added to reduce the solubility. The end result is a product which is high quality, clear, relatively cheap to produce, and recycles easily.

== Role in energy conservation ==
Approximately 25% to 30% of HVAC energy costs stem from heat gain and loss through the glazing in windows. Multiple methods have therefore been developed to minimize heat transfer through the glass. The glazing itself is a barrier to transfer via convection, so the two strategies for reducing heat transfer focus on minimizing conduction and radiation.

=== Double-paned windows ===
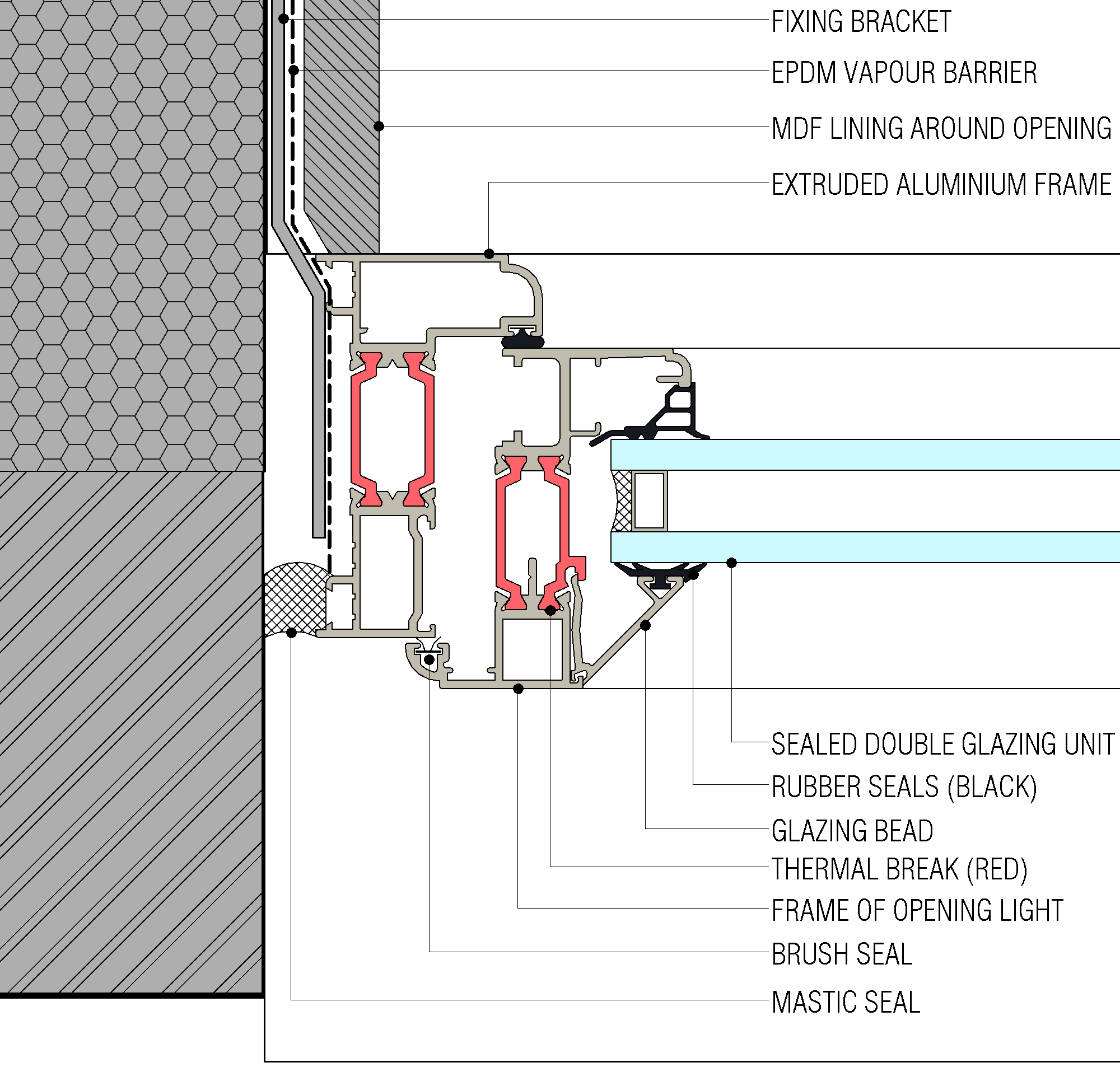
Overhead cross-section of a double-paned window

The strategy to reduce conduction is the use of Insulated glazing, where two or more panes of glass are used in series, each separated from each other by a space. Double-paned windows are the norm in new residential installations, as they offer substantial energy savings in comparison to single-paned glass. Each individual glass pane has poor insulation properties, with an R-value (insulation), or measure of an object's resistance to heat conduction, of 0.9.

However, when two panes are placed in series with a gap between them, held in place and sealed by a spacer, the still gas in the gap acts as an insulator. The ideal gap size varies by location, but on average it ranges from 15–18 mm thick, giving a final assembly size of 23–26 mm assuming a typical glazing thickness of 4 mm. A double-paned window with air in the gap has an R-value of 2.1, which is much better than the 0.9 that a single pane of glass yields. A triple-paned window, which is not as popular but is used occasionally in environments with extreme temperatures, has an R-value of 3.2. While these values are much lower than those of walls, which have R-values starting at 12-15, the reduction in heat transfer is nevertheless substantial. Higher R-values still can be obtained by filling the gap with a less conductive gas such as argon (or less commonly, krypton or xenon).

One final alternate method to reducing conduction is by creating and maintaining a vacuum in between the panes of glass, achieving a very high R-value of 10 while also greatly minimizing the required gap between the panes to 2 mm, yielding an assembly size as small as 10 mm. This technology was first launched commercially in 1996, and while several million units have been produced in the ensuing decades, it remains prohibitively expensive for most use cases and has yet to see widespread adoption.

=== Low-emissivity coating ===
The strategy to reduce radiation involves coating the glass with a low-emissivity (Low-E) coating, which reflects away much of the infrared light that hits it. There are two types of low-e coating. The first is Solar Control Low-E, where the intent is to block incoming solar radiation, which reduces heat gain inside the building and therefore the cooling costs associated with removing that heat. When installed on a double-paned window, the coating is placed on the inner face of the outside pane, and optionally on the inner face of the inner pane to improve insulating performance as well. This type of coating is most appropriate for cooling-dominated climates and buildings with large internal loads, where the goal is primarily to stop the buildings from overheating.

In a heating-dominated climate, the second type of low-e coating is more appropriate. This is Passive Low-E, where the goal is to retain heat inside the building. These coatings do not block as much of the short-wave infrared light from the sun, but do block any long-wave infrared light coming from the inside, functioning as somewhat of a greenhouse. These coatings are placed on the inner pane of glass, on the outer face if less solar heat gain is desired, and on the inner face if more solar heat gain is desired. Especially when combined with double-or-triple-paned windows, the R-values achieved with low-e coatings can be quite high, with a 3-paned window filled with argon with one low-e coating having an R-value of 5.4. One trade-off of low-e coatings is that while they are primarily aimed at reducing the amount of infrared light passing through the window, they do also somewhat reduce the amount of visible light passing through, and the building may incur higher lighting demand as a result.

There are two methods of applying the Low-E coating to the glazing: Hard Coat and Soft Coat. Hard Coat is applied either in or directly after the tin bath in the float glass manufacturing process. This produces a coating which is very durable and inexpensive, as it is added during the existing production process. However, it is not as energy efficient and allows more infrared light to pass through than the Soft Coat method. The Soft Coat, on the other hand, is applied after the glass has already been manufactured and cut and tends to be clearer and better at insulating. However, the additional manufacturing step adds to the cost of production, and the coating will degrade when exposed to the elements, and so can only be placed on the inside faces of a double-paned window. Generally, solar control Low-E windows are soft coat and passive Low-E windows are hard coat due to the lower emissivity of the soft coat.

== See also ==
- Architectural glass
- Fanlight
- Insulated glazing
- Quadruple glazing
- Noise mitigation
- Roof lantern
- Solar thermal collector
