= INEOS Styrolution =

German styrenics supplier

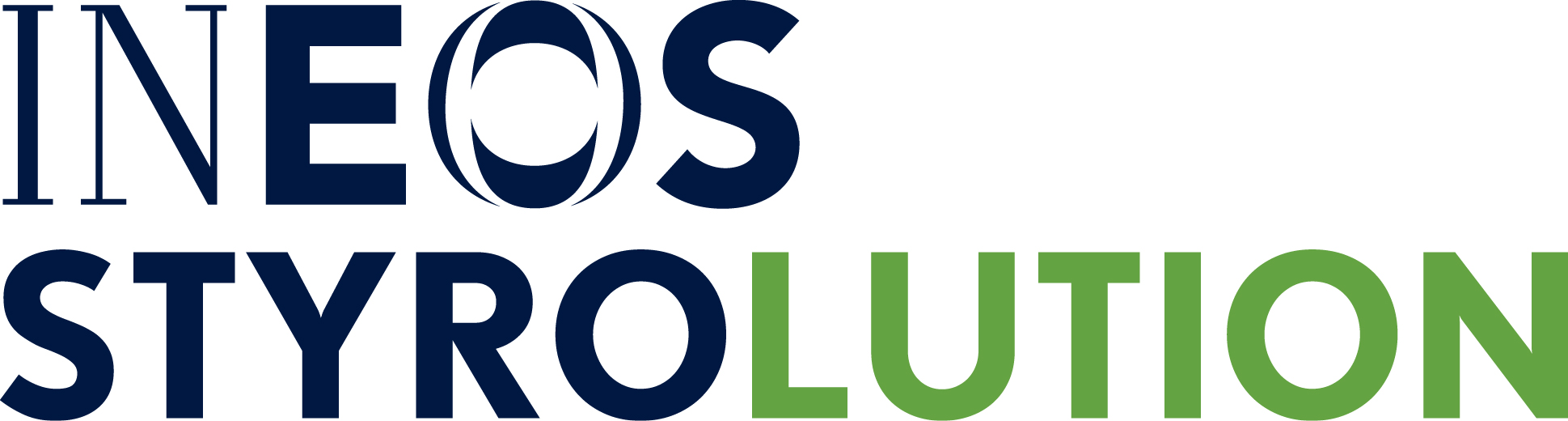
- Type: Subsidiary
- Industry: Chemical industry
- Founded: October 1, 2011; 15 years ago
- Headquarters: Frankfurt am Main, Germany
- Number of locations: Germany, Aurora, Illinois, United States (regional headquarters Americas), Singapore (regional headquarters Asia-Pacific)
- Area served: Worldwide
- Key people: Kevin McQuade (Chairman), Steve Harrington (CEO), John van Oorschot (CFO)
- Products: Styrenics
- Revenue: €6.6 billion (2022)
- Number of employees: 3,100 (2022)
- Parent: Ineos
- Website: www.ineos.com/businesses/ineos-styrolution/

INEOS Styrolution is a German styrenics supplier that is headquartered in Frankfurt am Main. It is a subsidiary of Ineos and provides styrenics applications for many everyday products across a broad range of industries, including automotive, electronics, household, construction, healthcare, packaging and toys/sports/leisure.

It has operations in Europe, the United States and Singapore with over 16 manufacturing sites.

== History ==
Styrolution was founded in October 2011 as a 50-50 joint venture between BASF and INEOS. Styrolution officially started operating as an independent company following the approval of the relevant antitrust authorities.

In 2014, a joint statement announced that INEOS would take over the 50% stake of BASF SE for a purchase price of €1.1bn.

In February 2022, it was announced that INEOS Styrolution had concluded a joint agreement for Ensinger to acquire its StyLight thermoplastic composite materials business.

In July 2022, an ABS joint venture was announced with SINOPEC as part of a $7bn deal between Ineos and SINOPEC with a new 600,000 tonnes world-scale ABS plant in Ningbo, China opening in 2023.

== Locations ==
Styrolution employs around 3,100 people. The global and European headquarters is situated in Frankfurt am Main, Germany, regional headquarters are located in Aurora, Illinois (United States) and Singapore. Styrolution operates 16 manufacturing sites across nine countries: Germany (Ludwigshafen, Schwarzheide, Cologne), Belgium (Antwerp), China (Foshan, Ningbo), France (Wingles), Korea (Ulsan, Yeosu), Thailand (Map Ta Phut), the United States (Channahon, Decatur, Texas City, Bayport), Canada (Sarnia) and Mexico (Altamira).

== Products ==
Styrolution offers various styrenics commodity and specialty product types, i.e. styrene monomer (SM), polystyrene (PS), acrylonitrile butadiene styrene (ABS), styrene-butadiene block copolymers (SBC), other styrene-based copolymers (SAN, AMSAN, ASA, MABS), and copolymer blends. Styrenics are thermoplastics. Product trade names include Novodur®, Terluran®, and Lustran (ABS); Terlux® (MABS); and Luran® (acrylonitrile styrene acrylate).

Styrene-butadiene block copolymer (SBC) is a thermoplastic resin that is transparent and impact-resistant. It is used to provide a high optical appearance and is mostly found in food and display packaging.

Styrene-based copolymers (SAN, AMSAN, ASA, MABS) and blends (ABS/PA, ASA/PA, ASA/PC) are thermoplastic resins that are mainly used in various technical applications, such as vehicles, garden equipment, tools, appliances, consumer electronics, communications devices and computers.
