= Thermal transmittance =

Rate of transfer of heat through matter, expressed as a U-value

Thermal transmittance is the rate of transfer of heat through matter. The thermal transmittance of a material (such as insulation or concrete) or an assembly (such as a wall or window) is expressed as a U-value. The thermal insulance of a structure is the reciprocal of its thermal transmittance.

== U-value ==
Although the concept of U-value (or U-factor) is universal, U-values can be expressed in different units. In most countries, U-value is expressed in SI units, as watts per square metre-kelvin:

W/(m^{2}⋅K)

In the United States, U-value is expressed as British thermal units (Btu) per hour-square feet-degrees Fahrenheit:

Btu/(h⋅ft^{2}⋅°F)

Within this article, U-values are expressed in SI unless otherwise noted. To convert from SI to US customary values, divide by 5.678.

Well-insulated parts of a building have a low thermal transmittance whereas poorly insulated parts of a building have a high thermal transmittance. Losses due to thermal radiation, thermal convection and thermal conduction are taken into account in the U-value. Although it has the same units as heat transfer coefficient, thermal transmittance is different in that the heat transfer coefficient is used to solely describe heat transfer in fluids while thermal transmittance is used to simplify an equation that has several different forms of thermal resistances.

It is described by the equation:

Φ = A × U × (T_{1} - T_{2})

where Φ is the heat transfer in watts, U is the thermal transmittance, T_{1} is the temperature on one side of the structure, T_{2} is the temperature on the other side of the structure and A is the area in square metres.

Thermal transmittances of most walls and roofs can be calculated using ISO 6946, unless there is metal bridging the insulation in which case it can be calculated using ISO 10211. For most ground floors it can be calculated using ISO 13370. For most windows the thermal transmittance can be calculated using ISO 10077 or ISO 15099. ISO 9869 describes how to measure the thermal transmittance of a structure experimentally. Choice of materials and quality of installation has a critical impact on the window insulation results. The frame and double sealing of the window system are the actual weak points in the window insulation.

Typical thermal transmittance values for common building structures are as follows:

- Single glazing: 5.7 W/(m^{2}⋅K)
- Single glazed windows, allowing for frames: 4.5 W/(m^{2}⋅K)
- Double glazed windows, allowing for frames: 3.3 W/(m^{2}⋅K)
- Double glazed windows with advanced coatings: 2.2 W/(m^{2}⋅K)
- Double glazed windows with advanced coatings and frames: 1.2 W/(m^{2}⋅K)
- Triple glazed windows, allowing for frames: 1.8 W/(m^{2}⋅K)
- Triple glazed windows, with advanced coatings and frames: 0.8 W/(m^{2}⋅K)
- Well-insulated roofs: 0.10 W/(m^{2}⋅K)
- Poorly insulated roofs: 1.0 W/(m^{2}⋅K)
- Well-insulated walls: 0.15 W/(m^{2}⋅K)
- Poorly insulated walls: 2 W/(m^{2}⋅K)
- Well-insulated floors: 0.2 W/(m^{2}⋅K)
- Poorly insulated floors: 1.0 W/(m^{2}⋅K)

In practice the thermal transmittance is strongly affected by the quality of workmanship and if insulation is fitted poorly, the thermal transmittance can be considerably higher than if insulation is fitted well

== Calculating thermal transmittance ==
When calculating a thermal transmittance it is helpful to consider the building's construction in terms of its different layers. For instance a cavity wall might be described as in the following table:

Thickness	Material	Conductivity (λ)	Insulance = thickness / conductivity
—	Outside surface	—	0.04 K⋅m^{2}/W
0.10 m (0.33 ft)	Clay bricks	0.77 W/(m⋅K)	0.13 K⋅m^{2}/W
0.05 m (0.16 ft)	Glasswool	0.04 W/(m⋅K)	1.25 K⋅m^{2}/W
0.10 m (0.33 ft)	Concrete blocks	1.13 W/(m⋅K)	0.09 K⋅m^{2}/W
—	Inside surface	—	0.13 K⋅m^{2}/W

In this example the total insulance is 1.64 K⋅m^{2}/W. The thermal transmittance of the structure is the reciprocal of the total thermal insulance. The thermal transmittance of this structure is therefore 0.61 W/(m^{2}⋅K).

(Note that this example is simplified as it does not take into account any metal connectors, air gaps interrupting the insulation or mortar joints between the bricks and concrete blocks.)

It is possible to allow for mortar joints in calculating the thermal transmittance of a wall, as in the following table. Since the mortar joints allow heat to pass more easily than the light concrete blocks, the mortar is said to "bridge" the light concrete blocks.

Thickness	Material	Conductivity (λ)	Insulance = thickness / conductivity
—	Outside surface	—	0.04 K⋅m^{2}/W
0.10 m (0.33 ft)	Clay bricks	0.77 W/(m⋅K)	0.13 K⋅m^{2}/W
0.05 m (0.16 ft)	Glasswool	0.04 W/(m⋅K)	1.25 K⋅m^{2}/W
0.10 m (0.33 ft)	Light concrete blocks	0.30 W/(m⋅K)	0.33 K⋅m^{2}/W
(Bridge, 7%)	Mortar between concrete blocks	0.88 W/(m⋅K)	0.11 K⋅m^{2}/W
0.01 m (0.033 ft)	Plaster	0.57 W/(m⋅K)	0.02 K⋅m^{2}/W
—	Inside surface	—	0.13 K⋅m^{2}/W

The average thermal insulance of the "bridged" layer depends upon the fraction of the area taken up by the mortar in comparison with the fraction of the area taken up by the light concrete blocks. To calculate thermal transmittance when there are "bridging" mortar joints it is necessary to calculate two quantities, known as R_{max} and R_{min}. R_{max} can be thought of as the total thermal insulance obtained if it is assumed that there is no lateral flow of heat and R_{min} can be thought of as the total thermal insulance obtained if it is assumed that there is no resistance to the lateral flow of heat. The U-value of the above construction is approximately equal to 2 / (R_{max} + R_{min}) Further information about how to deal with "bridging" is given in ISO 6946.

== Measuring thermal transmittance ==
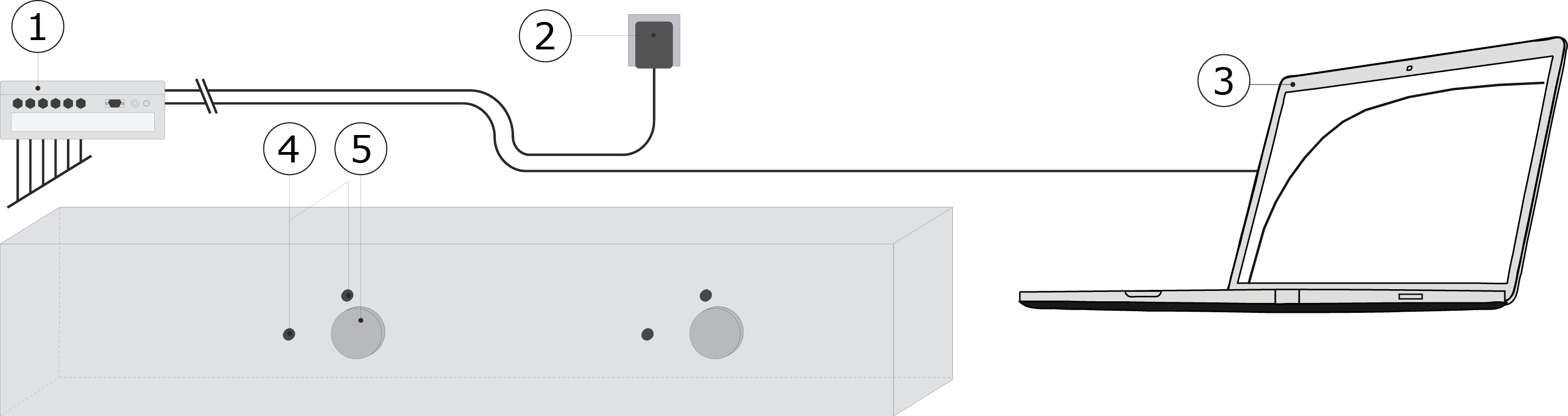
Schematic of ISO and ASTM compliant thermal transmittance measuring system.

Whilst calculation of thermal transmittance can readily be carried out with the help of software which is compliant with ISO 6946, a thermal transmittance calculation does not fully take workmanship into account and it does not allow for adventitious circulation of air between, through and around sections of insulation. To take the effects of workmanship-related factors fully into account it is necessary to carry out a thermal transmittance measurement.

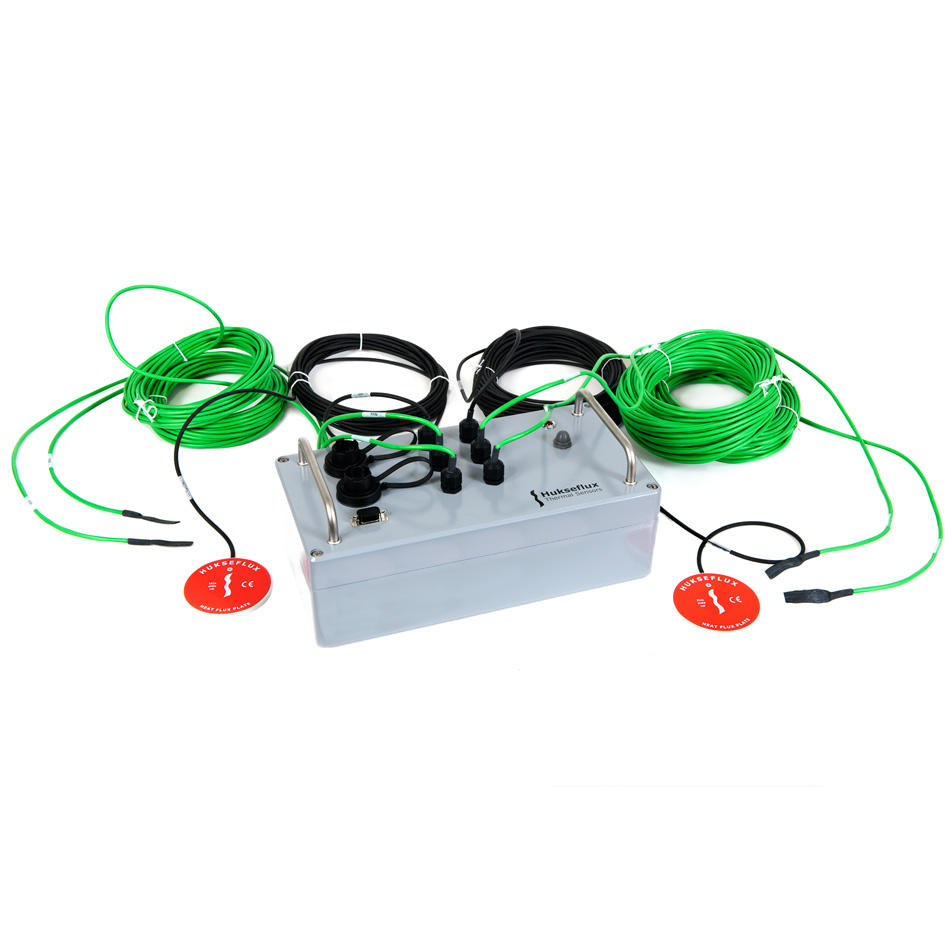
Example of measurement system for thermal transmittance according to ISO 9869 and ASTM C1155, model TRSYS.

ISO 9869 describes how to measure the thermal transmittance of a roof or a wall by using heat flux sensor. These heat flux meters usually consist of thermopiles which provide an electrical signal which is in direct proportion to the heat flux. Typically they might be about 100 mm (3.9 in) in diameter and perhaps about 5 mm (0.20 in) thick and they need to be fixed firmly to the roof or wall which is under test in order to ensure good thermal contact. When the heat flux is monitored over a sufficiently long time, the thermal transmittance can be calculated by dividing the average heat flux by the average difference in temperature between the inside and outside of the building. For most wall and roof constructions the heat flux meter needs to monitor heat flows (and internal and external temperatures) continuously for a period of 72 hours to be conform the ISO 9869 standards.

Generally, thermal transmittance measurements are most accurate when:

- The difference in temperature between the inside and outside of the building is at least 5 °C (9.0 °F).
- The weather is cloudy rather than sunny (this makes accurate measurement of temperature easier).
- There is good thermal contact between the heat flux meter and the wall or roof being tested.
- The monitoring of heat flow and temperatures is carried out over at least 72 hours.
- Different spots on a building element are measured or a thermographic camera is used to secure the homogeneity of the building element.

When convection currents play a part in transmitting heat across a building component, then thermal transmittance increases as the temperature difference increases. For example, for an internal temperature of 20 °C (68 °F) and an external temperature of −20 °C (−4 °F), the optimum gap between panes in a double glazed window will be smaller than the optimum gap for an external temperature of 0 °C (32 °F).

The inherent thermal transmittance of materials can also vary with temperature—the mechanisms involved are complex, and the transmittance may increase or decrease as the temperature increases.

== See also ==
- R-value (insulation)
