= Warm edge =

Type of spacer bar used in insulated glazing

A warm edge spacer is a type of spacer bar used in insulated glazing. It separates the panes of glass in double or triple glazing, or curtain walling and seals off the air cavity between each. Recent warm edge spacers are generally made from plastics, although stainless steel can meet the definition.

Warm edge spacers were developed as a higher performance alternative to aluminum or regular steel spacers, which allow heat transfer through the window, leading to both heat loss and condensation.

To be classed as a warm edge spacer, the product must meet the requirements of Annex E of DIN EN ISO 10077-1 (for windows), or Annex B of standard DIN EN ISO 12631 (for curtain walls).

All leading manufacturers of warm edge systems are represented on the Warm Edge Working Group, founded in 1998 as a subcommittee of the Technical Committee of Bundesverband Flachglas, to work on improving evaluation methods.
