= Quadruple glazing =

Type of insulated glazing

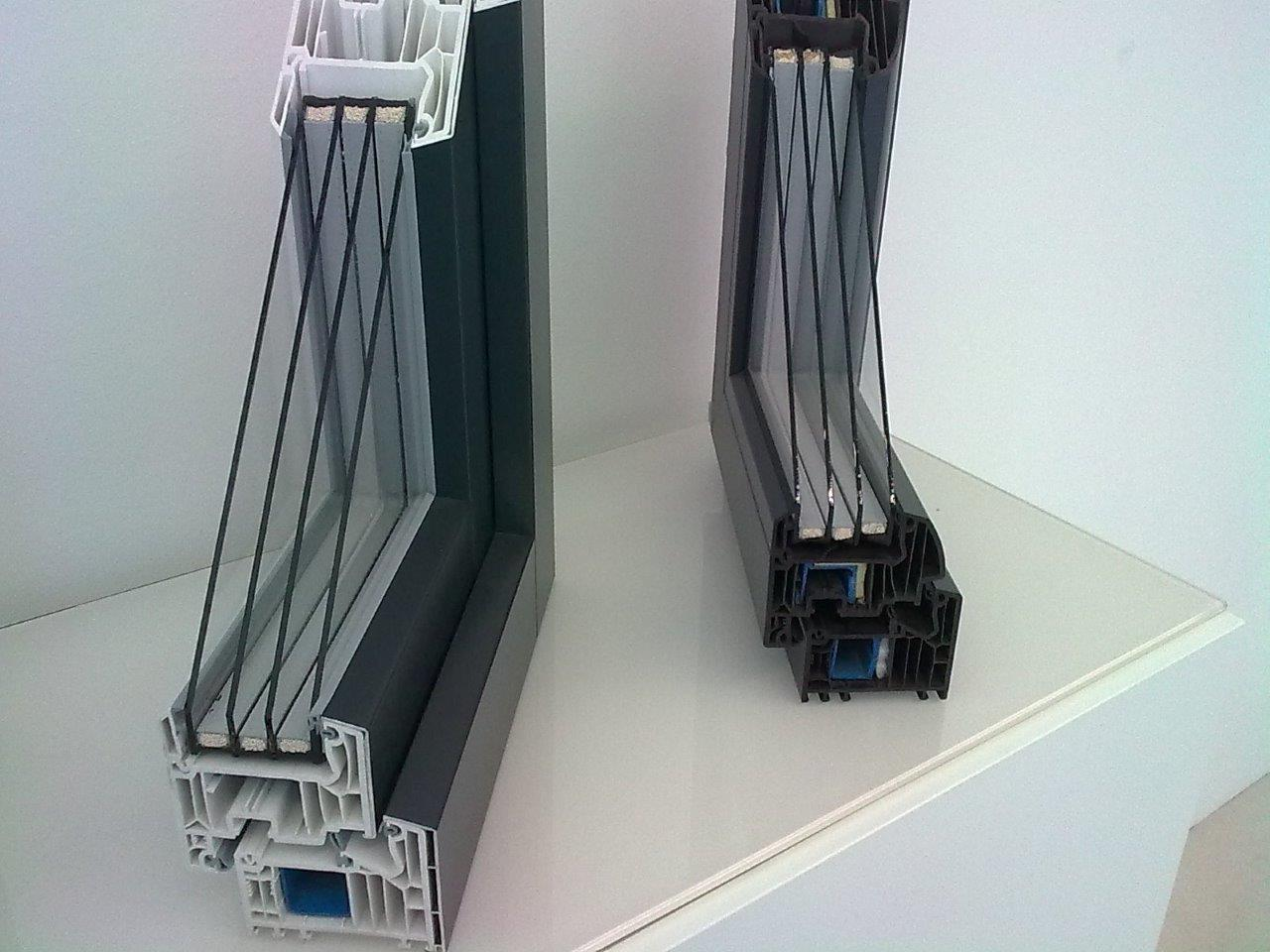
Standard quadruple glazed window - openable

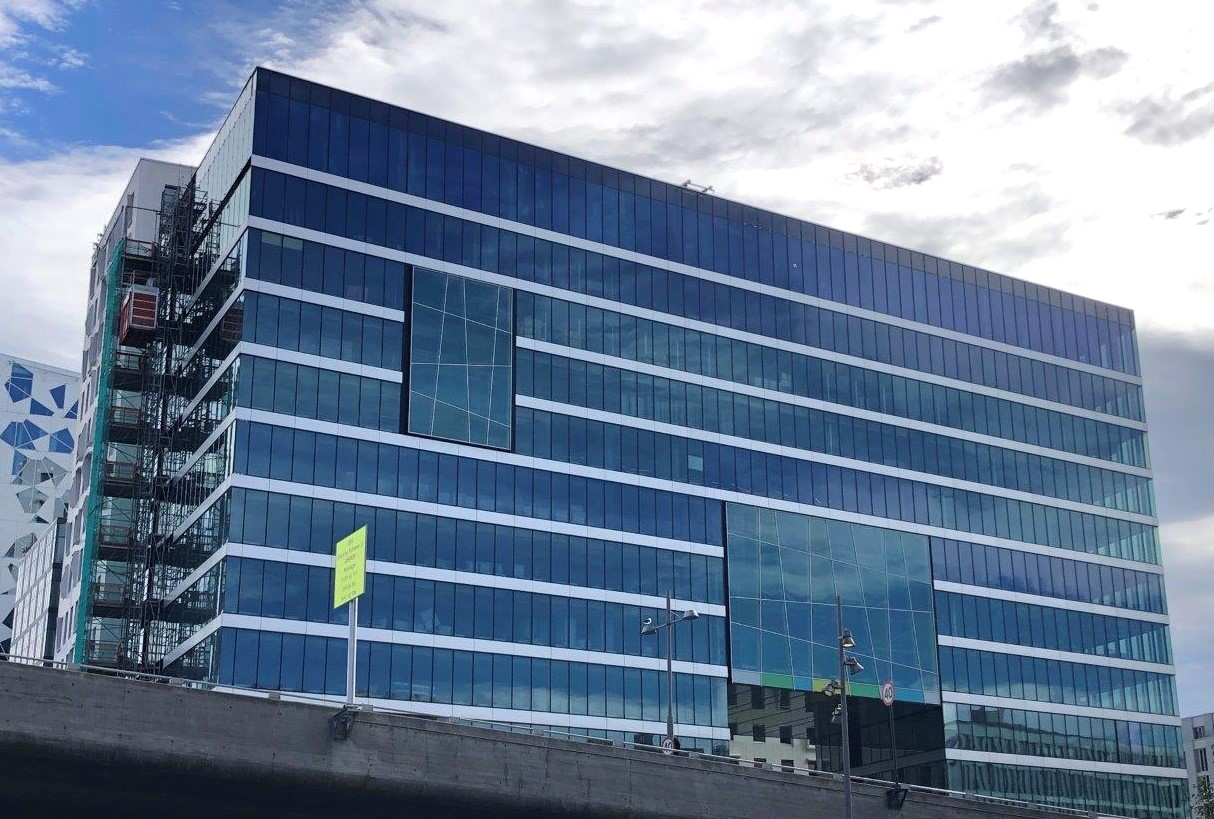
The quadruple glazing, Q-Air, on Deg 8 building in Oslo, Norway (2020). Renovation brings U_{g} value of 0.29 W/(m^{2}K) [R-value 20

Quadruple glazing (quadruple-pane insulating glazing) is a type of insulated glazing comprising four glass panes, typically equipped with low emissivity coatings and insulating gases in the cavities between them. It is a subset of multipane (multilayer) glazing systems. Multipane glazing with up to six panes is commercially available.

Multipane glazing improves thermal comfort by reducing downdraft convection currents near the window surface. It can also reduce greenhouse gas emissions by minimizing heating and cooling demands. Quadruple glazing may be necessary to achieve desired levels of energy efficiency in Arctic regions, or to allow higher glazing ratios in curtain walling without increasing winter heat loss. Its low thermal transmittance can also eliminate the need for modulated external sun shading, as solar gain can be managed by the window glazing itself. In Nordic countries, some triple-glazed buildings are being upgraded to four or more layers.

== Cost-efficiency ==
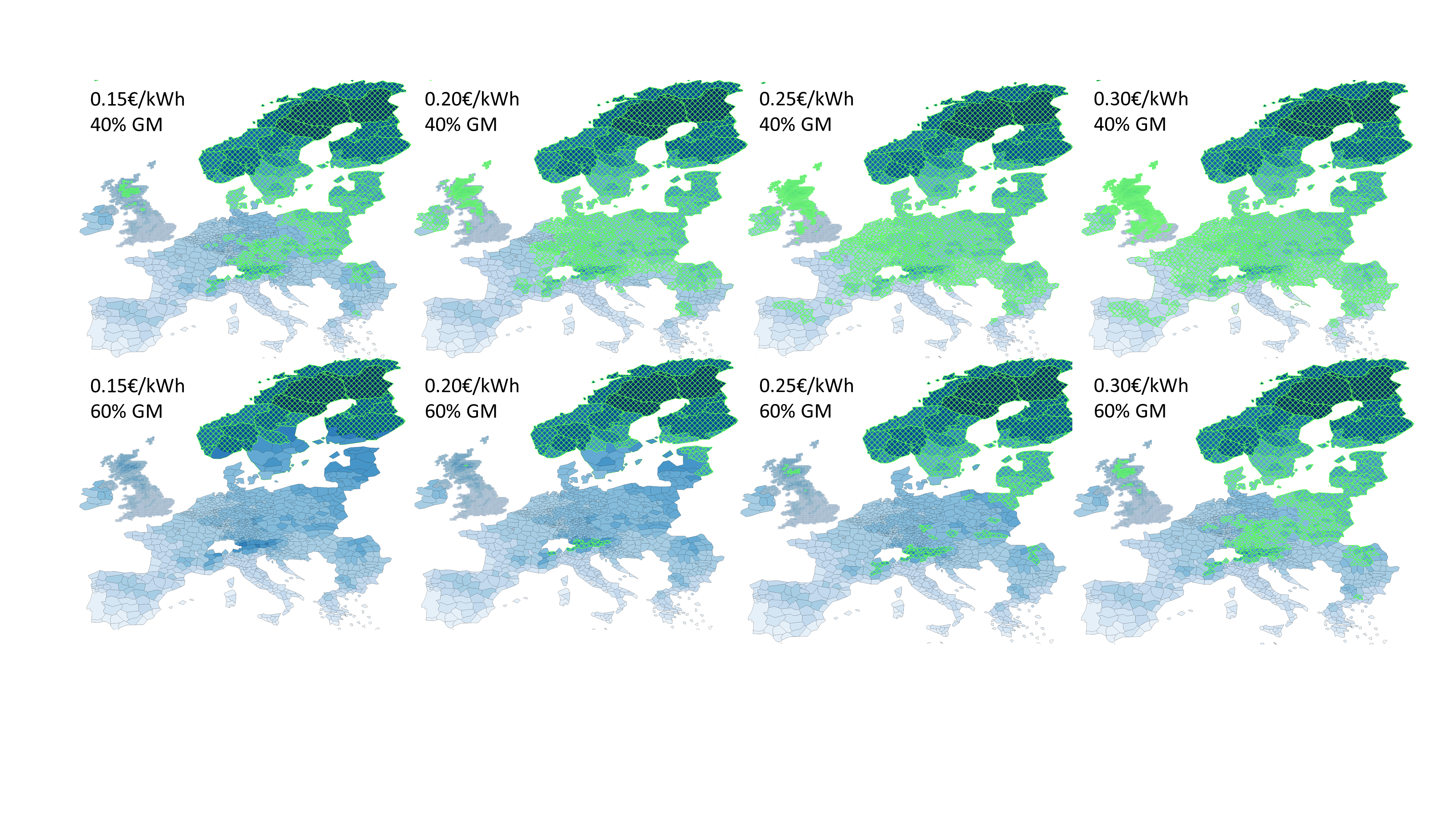
Quadruple glazing shows cost-efficiency in colder European regions with high heating demand, particularly where electricity prices are moderate to high. GM = QGU price Gross Margin.

Quadruple glazing (QGU) has been shown to be cost-effective in colder climates where heating demand is high. Compared to triple glazing (TGU), QGU substantially reduces delivered heating energy, while only modestly increasing cooling demand. This makes it a suitable solution for zero-emission building designs aiming to minimize operational energy use without reliance on active heating systems.

Cost efficiency depends on both climate and electricity pricing. In colder regions with higher heating degree days (HDD), such as Oslo, QGU typically achieves payback within a decade under standard pricing margins. In moderate climates, cost-effectiveness remains achievable, particularly in settings with elevated electricity costs or strict heating demand targets.

QGU is particularly advantageous in buildings with high window-to-wall ratios, where glazing performance critically influences heating loads. Its use enables architectural freedom without compromising thermal performance. In addition to reducing annual heating demand, QGU significantly lowers peak heating power, potentially allowing the elimination of central heating systems in favour of decentralized or ventilation-integrated solutions.

These characteristics also support broader energy transition strategies, reducing reliance on seasonal energy storage and enabling more compact, cost-effective building services. This makes QGU an important component in cost-optimal design pathways for zero-energy and zero-emission buildings.

The improved thermal insulation offered by QGU also contributes to reducing the scale and cost of seasonal energy storage, a key challenge in energy transition strategies. These benefits support the inclusion of QGU in cost-optimal design pathways for zero-energy and zero-emission buildings.

== Features ==
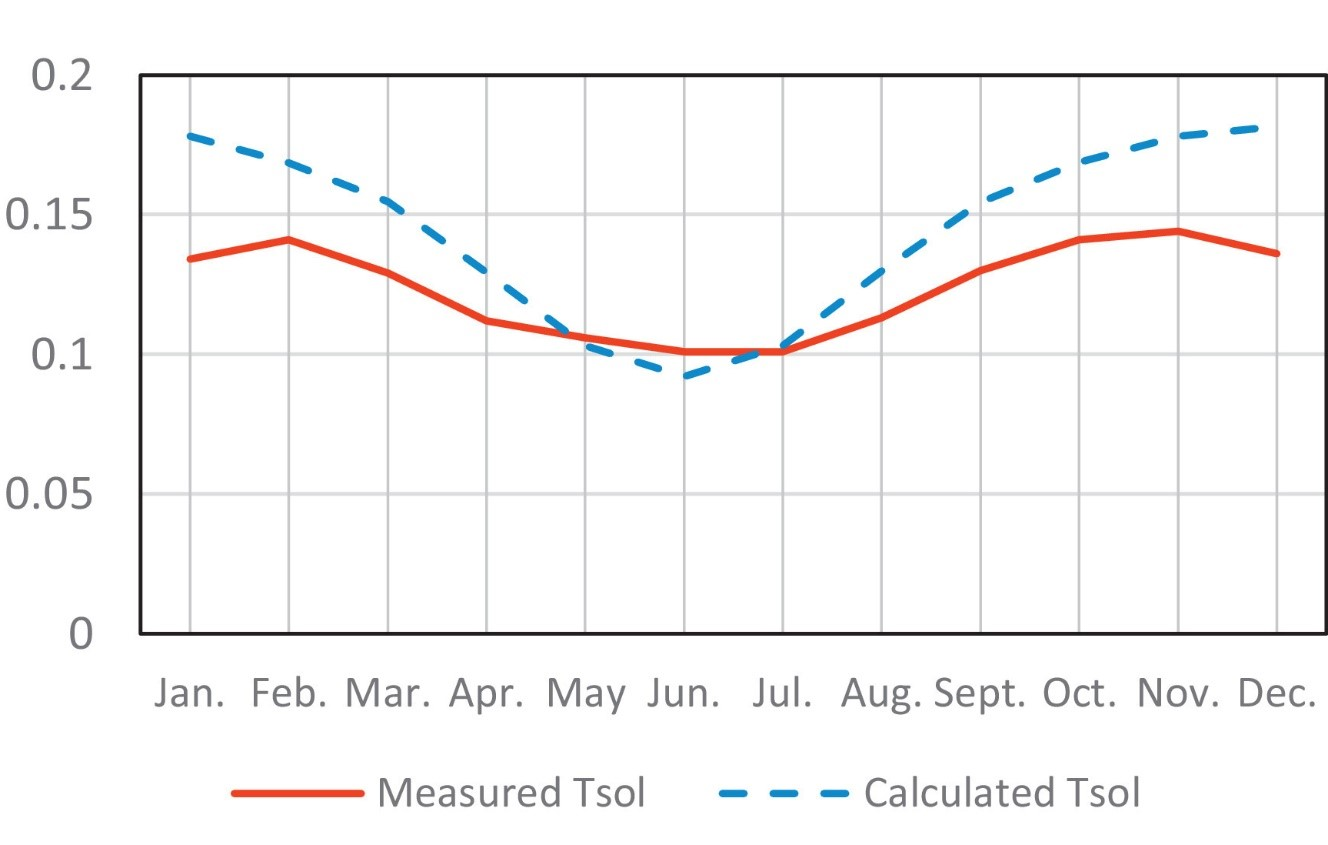
Measured and clear-sky calculated seasonal dependence of the direct solar energy transmittance in multipane glazing.

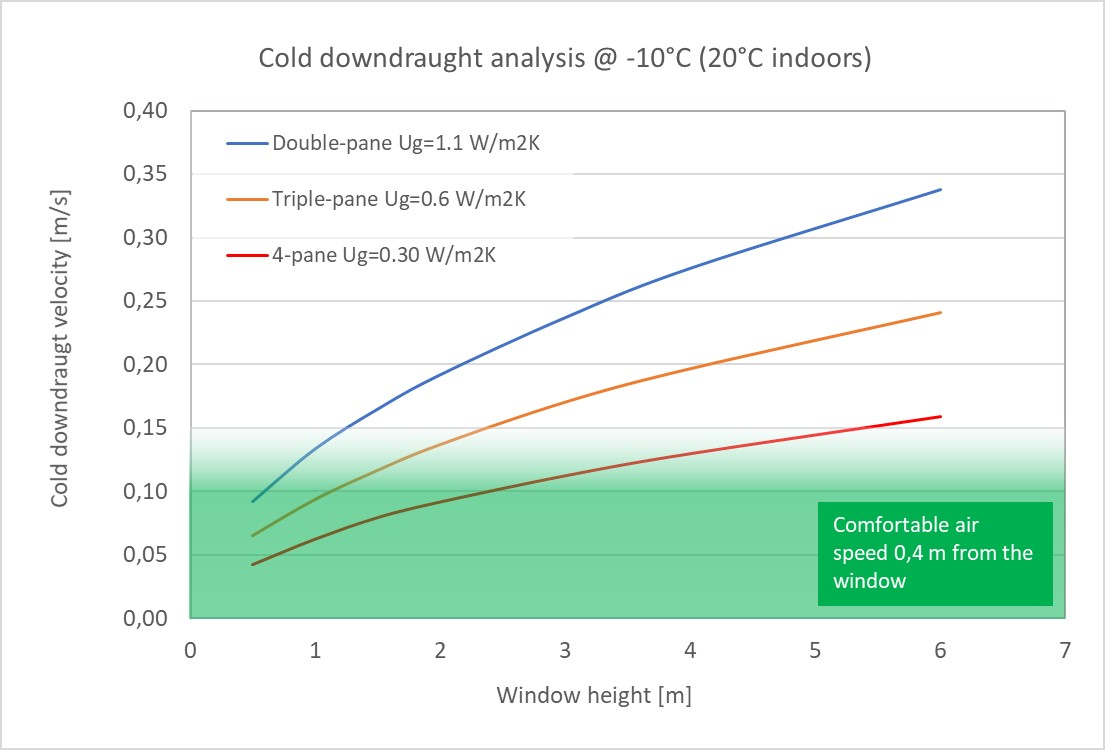
Cold downdraught analysis in multipane glazing.

With quadruple glazing, a center-of-panel U-value (U_{g}) of 0.33 W/(m^{2}K) [R-value 17] is readily achievable. Six-pane glazing has reached values as low as 0.24 W/(m^{2}K) [R-value 24]. This brings several advantages:

Energy-efficient buildings without modulated sun shading
An overall window thermal transmittance of less than 0.4 W/(m^{2}K) is achievable without relying on modulated external shading. A study by Svendsen et al. showed that glazing with moderate solar gain and low U-values performs comparably to windows with high solar gain and external shading. As heating demands drop with lower U-values, wintertime solar gain may suffice to heat the building.

Seasonal variation in solar gain
Fresnel reflections, dependent on the angle of incidence, cause the optical characteristics of multipane glazing to vary with the season. This results in reduced solar gain during summer months. The effect is sometimes visible to the naked eye.

Occupant comfort
Compared to traditional double- or triple-pane windows with mechanical shading, multipane glazing offers better visual connection between indoors and outdoors. Low U-values help maintain more uniform glass temperatures year-round. Downdrafts are minimal, allowing people to sit near the window as comfortably as by a solid wall. Shading may still be desired for privacy.

Nearly zero heating building
As early as 1995, it was predicted that a glazing U-value of 0.3 W/(m^{2}K) could make zero-heating buildings feasible. Svendsen et al. confirmed that system U-values of 0.3 W/(m^{2}K) could reduce heating demand to near zero. In theory, summer cooling demand could be met by photovoltaics, as peak sunlight often aligns with peak cooling demand. However, practical mismatches may occur due to humidity, dehumidification needs, and thermal inertia.

== Engineering ==
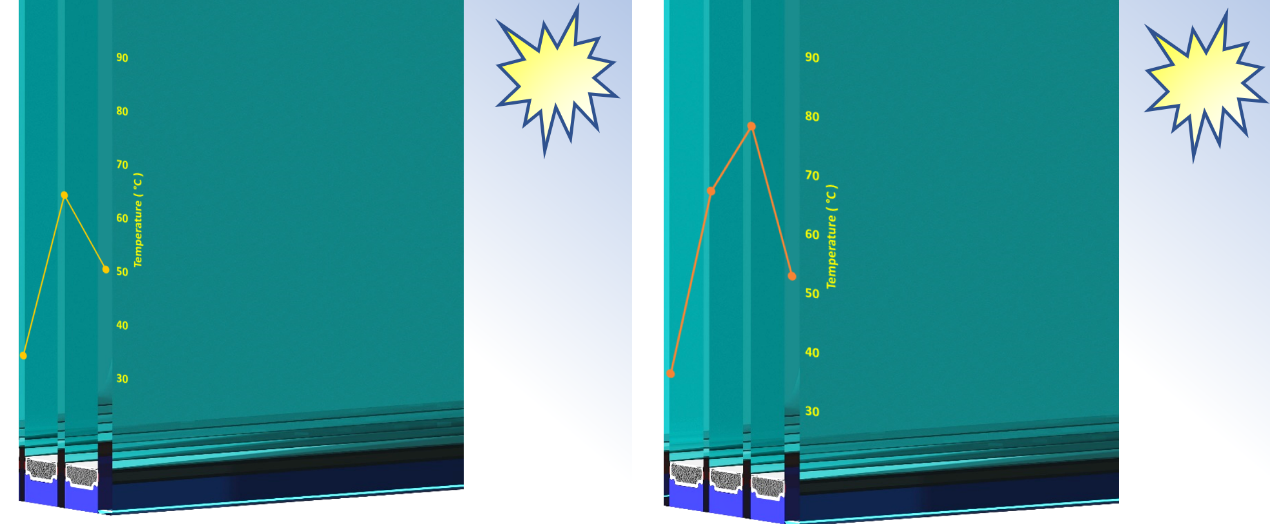
Peak solar radiation-induced temperature profile for triple- and quadruple-pane glazing with low-E coatings and argon fill.

Intermediate panes in multipane glazing are often made thinner to reduce weight. To prevent thermal stress cracking, heat-strengthened glass may be used. Special attention must be paid to spacer and sealant temperatures, as solar radiation heating may exceed design limits.

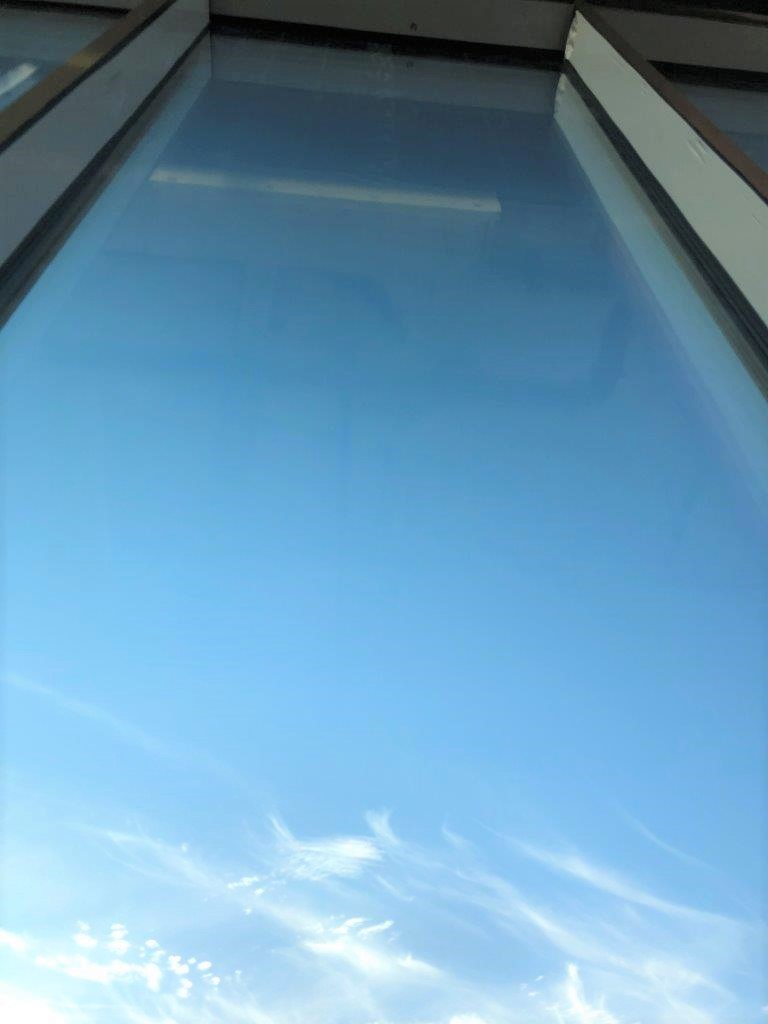
Angle-dependent view through the quad glazing from inside the Deg 8 building in Oslo.

As the number of panes increases, solar heating of intermediate glass layers also increases. This necessitates careful design to manage gas expansion between panes. Breather vents or interlayer vents may help control glass bulging. Finite element analysis is often used to determine appropriate pane thicknesses and account for nonlinear plate mechanics.

== Performance ==
Double-pane windows have long been the industry standard. While significantly better than single-pane, further energy savings from higher-performance windows have been limited. However, recent cost reductions in thin glass (as used in smartphones and displays) and krypton gas (used in halogen lighting) have enabled the development of lightweight, cost-effective quad-pane windows. Researchers at the National Renewable Energy Laboratory tested two quad-pane window configurations from Alpen High Performance at the Denver Federal Center. Both were similar in thickness and weight to standard commercial double-pane windows. One design used suspended films; the other used ultra-thin glass. The windows achieved 24% energy savings for heating and cooling compared to high-performance double-pane models. Depending on climate and utility costs, payback periods ranged from one to six years.

== See also ==
- Passive house
- Curtain wall (architecture)
- Window
- Passive solar building design
- History of passive solar building design
