= LucaNet =

German management software company

Lucanet
- Type: Private
- Industry: Software, Tech Services
- Founded: 1999; 27 years ago
- Founders: Rolf-Jürgen Moll, Oliver Schmitz
- Headquarters: Berlin, Germany
- Area served: Worldwide
- Key people: Elias Apel (CEO)
- Products: Financial software
- Services: Consolidation and Financial Planning, ESG Reporting, Disclosure Management, XBRL, Tax Compliance and Reporting, Lease Accounting, Banking and Cash Management, Extended Planning and Analysis
- Number of employees: ~900 (2026)

Lucanet is a financial software company founded in 1999 in Germany. Its software is compatible with all common ERP systems and databases. The company's name is inspired by Luca Pacioli, known for writing the first treatise on double-entry bookkeeping.

== History ==
Lucanet was founded in 1999 in Berlin, Germany, by Rolf-Jürgen Moll and Oliver Schmitz. The company developed the first software for consolidation and planning in one data model.

In 2006, the company opened its first location outside of Germany, in the Netherlands.

In 2022, the company partnered with the British equity firm Hg Capital, a global software and services investor. The same year, it also partnered with PAS Financial Advisory and acquired Belgian distributor SEEFO to expand in Belgium and Luxembourg.

In 2023, the company acquired AMANA, a provider of accounting and tax software, and ementexx, a digital banking and cash management company.

Former CRO Dominik Duchon was CEO from 2022 to 2023, and Elias Apel has been CEO since 1 October 2023.

In 2024, Lucanet acquired Causal, a London-based company specialising in financial planning and analysis.

Lucanet has offices in Germany (Berlin, Munich, and Essen), as well as locations in Austria, Switzerland, the Netherlands, Belgium, the UK, France, Spain, Italy, the US, Singapore, Japan, and China. The company employs over 900 people. As of 2026, the company serves over 6,500 organizations.

== Product ==
Lucanet’s CFO Solution Platform is designed to digitalise financial management processes. The SaaS platform integrates key finance functions, including consolidation, extended planning and analysis, disclosure management, ESG reporting, XBRL, lease accounting, banking and treasury management, as well as tax compliance and reporting, into a unified cloud-based system. The platform is designed for quick adoption and seamless integration with other systems. In June 2026, Lucanet launched a family of AI agents for financial modelling, variance analysis, and month-end closing.
