= Window insulation film =

Insulating film applied to glass windows

Window insulation film is a plastic film which can be applied to glass windows to reduce heat transfer. There are two types in common use designed to reduce heat flow via radiation and convection respectively.

== Solar control film ==
This works by reflecting the infra-red component of solar energy (often 700W/sq M) and absorbing the UV component. Some films are also silvered or tinted to reduce visible light.

Typical absorption for a silvered film is 65% for visible and infra red with 99% for UV. This type of film sticks directly onto the glass.

== Convection control film ==
A film is attached to the window frame to trap a pocket of air between the glass and the film, creating a double-glazed system with an insulating gap of still air. Thermal conductivity of still air is 0.024 W/(m.K) and much lower than that of glass (0.96 W/(m.K)). Factors which limit the performance of a double glazed window are gap width, convection within the cavity and radiative heat transfer across the gap which is largely independent of its width.

Optimal gap width depends on the temperature difference imposed across the gap. A European standard (EN 673) uses 20 °C difference between the inside and outside temperature which results in an optimal simulated gap width of about 17 mm for a standard double glazed window. The US standard (NFRC), using a 39 °C difference, yields a smaller optimal gap width of about 13 mm. Under the European standard, a window with a 17 mm gap has a simulated U-Value of about 2.8 W/(m²K), one with a smaller 6 mm gap about 3.3 W/(m²K), while single glazing has a U-value of about 5.5 W/(m²K). (See also insulated glazing.)

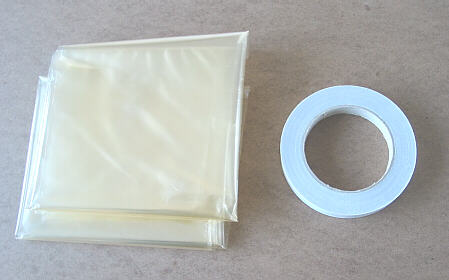
A typical window insulation film kit, consisting of plastic shrink film (folded-up) and a roll of double-sided tape

One commonly used film is a heat-shrink plastic which is attached to the window frame using double-sided pressure-sensitive tape. A hair dryer is used to remove creases and improve optical clarity.

Reduced heat flow also helps prevent condensation which is triggered when the temperature of the inside surface falls below the dew point. Assuming an outside temperature of 0 °C with wind velocity 7 m/s (15 mph; 24 km/h) and inside temperature 20 °C condensation occurs at only 30%RH relative humidity with a single-glazed system compared with 60%RH for a double-glazed system. Condensation also transfers additional heat, which can be significant.

== Applications ==
"Low-E" glass was introduced to the North American residential market in the 1980s through a collaboration between Rob Hammon (now with BIRAenergy) and Wade Martin, a windshield glass manufacturer.

Solar control film helps reduce excessive sunlight during summer. Convection control film is commonly used in winter to limit heat loss, particularly in single-glazed windows where the temperature difference is often sufficient to cause condensation.

== See also ==
- Shrink film
