= R-value (insulation) =

Measure of how well an object, per unit of area, resists conductive flow of heat

Graph showing how heat transfer decreases as insulation thickness increases.

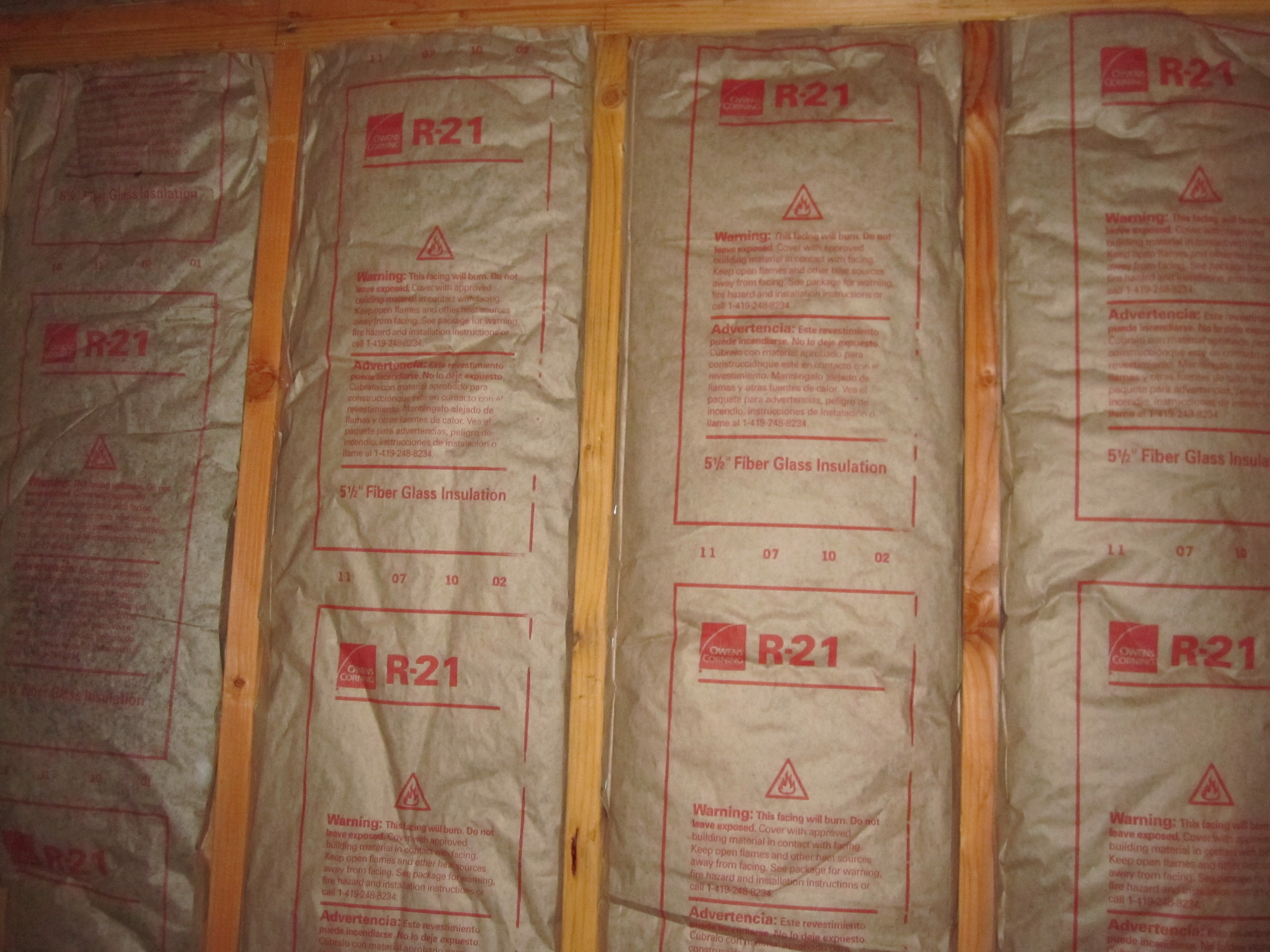
Installed faced fiberglass batt insulation with its R-value visible (R-21)

The R-value is a measure of thermal resistance, specifically how well a two-dimensional barrier, such as a layer of insulation, a window, or a complete wall or ceiling, resists the conductive flow of heat, in the context of construction. The higher the R-value, the more insulating the material is. Higher R-values can reduce heating bills in cold weather and cooling bills in hot weather.

R-value can be expressed with in both metric and United States customary units. When expressed in metric, the term RSI-value is often used. R-values expressed in United States customary units are approximately 5.68 times as large as R-values expressed in metric.

An R-value can be given for a material (e.g., for polyethylene foam), or for an assembly of materials (e.g., a wall or a window). In the case of materials, it is often expressed in terms of R-value per metre, or per inch in the US. R-values are additive for multiple layers of materials. R-value is defined as the temperature difference needed to sustain one unit of heat flux between the warmer surface and colder surface of a barrier under steady-state conditions.

The U-factor or U-value is the overall heat transfer coefficient and can be found by taking the inverse of the R-value. It is a property that describes how well building elements conduct heat per unit area across a temperature gradient. The elements are commonly assemblies of many layers of materials, such as those that make up the building envelope. It is expressed in watts per square metre kelvin. The higher the U-value, the lower the ability of the building envelope to resist heat transfer. A low U-value, or conversely a high R-value, usually indicates high levels of insulation. They are useful as it is a way of predicting the composite behaviour of an entire building element rather than relying on the properties of individual materials.

== R-value definition ==
R-value is defined as
$$R_\text{val}=\frac{\Delta T}{\phi_q},$$

where (using SI units):

- $R_\text{val}$ (K⋅m^{2}/W) is the R-value,
- $\Delta T$ (K) is the temperature difference between the warmer surface and colder surface of a barrier,
- $\phi_q$ (W/m^{2}) is the heat flux through the barrier.

The R-value per unit of a barrier's exposed surface area measures the absolute thermal resistance of the barrier.
$$\frac{R_\text{val}}{A} = R,$$

where (using SI units):

- $R_\text{val}$ is the R-value (m^{2}⋅K⋅W^{−1})
- $A$ is the barrier's exposed surface area (m^{2})
- $R$ is the absolute thermal resistance (K⋅W^{−1})

Absolute thermal resistance, $R$, quantifies the temperature difference per unit of heat flow rate needed to sustain one unit of heat flow rate. Confusion sometimes arises because some publications use the term thermal resistance for the temperature difference per unit of heat flux, but other publications use the term thermal resistance for the temperature difference per unit of heat flow rate. Further confusion arises because some publications use the character R to denote the temperature difference per unit of heat flux, but other publications use the character R to denote the temperature difference per unit of heat flow rate. This article uses the term absolute thermal resistance for the temperature difference per unit of heat flow rate and uses the term R-value for the temperature difference per unit of heat flux.

The greater the R-value, the greater the resistance, and so the better the thermal insulating properties of the barrier. R-values are used in describing the effectiveness of insulating material and in analysis of heat flow across assemblies (such as walls, roofs, and windows) under steady-state conditions. Heat flow through a barrier is driven by temperature difference between two sides of the barrier, and the R-value quantifies how effectively the object resists this drive: The temperature difference divided by the R-value and then multiplied by the exposed surface area of the barrier gives the total rate of heat flow through the barrier, as measured in watts or in BTUs per hour.
$$\phi = \frac{\Delta T \sdot A}{R_\text{val}},$$

where (using SI units):

- $R_\text{val}$ is the R-value (K⋅m^{2}/W),
- $\Delta T$ is the temperature difference (K) between the warmer surface and colder surface of the barrier,
- $A$ is the exposed surface area (m^{2}) of the barrier,
- $\phi$ is the heat flow rate (W) through the barrier.

As long as the materials involved are dense solids in direct mutual contact, R-values are additive; for example, the total R-value of a barrier composed of several layers of material is the sum of the R-values of the individual layers.

For example, in winter it might be 2 °C outside and 20 °C inside, making a temperature difference of 18 °C or 18 K. If the material has an R-value of 4, it will lose 0.25 W/(°C⋅m^{2}). With an area of 100 m^{2}, the heat energy being lost is 0.25 W/(K⋅m^{2}) × 18 °C × 100 m^{2} = 450 W. There will be other losses through the floor, windows, ventilation slots, etc. But for that material alone, 450 W is going out, and can be replaced with a 450 W heater inside, to maintain the inside temperature.

== Terminology and units ==
Note that the R-value is the building industry term for what is in other contexts called "thermal resistance" "for a unit area." It is sometimes denoted RSI-value if the SI (metric) units are used.

An R-value can be given for a material (e.g., for polyethylene foam), or for an assembly of materials (e.g., a wall or a window). In the case of materials, it is often expressed in terms of R-value per unit length (e.g., per inch of thickness). The latter can be misleading in the case of low-density building thermal insulations, for which R-values are not additive: their R-value per inch is not constant as the material gets thicker, but rather usually decreases.

The units of an R-value (see below) are usually not explicitly stated, and so it is important to determine from context which units are being used: an R-value expressed in I-P (inch-pound) units is about 5.68 times larger than when expressed in SI units, so that, for example, a window that is R-2 in I-P units has an RSI of 0.35 (since 2/5.68 = 0.35). For R-values there is no difference between US customary units and imperial units.

All of the following mean the same thing: "this is an R-2 window"; "this is an R2 window"; "this window has an R-value of 2"; "this is a window with R = 2" (and similarly with RSI-values, which also include the possibility "this window provides RSI 0.35 of resistance to heat flow").

== Apparent R-value ==
The more a material is intrinsically able to conduct heat, as given by its thermal conductivity, the lower its R-value. On the other hand, the thicker the material, the higher its R-value. Sometimes heat transfer processes other than conduction (namely, convection and radiation) significantly contribute to heat transfer within the material. In such cases, it is useful to introduce an "apparent thermal conductivity", which captures the effects of all three kinds of processes, and to define the R-value more generally as the thickness of a sample divided by its apparent thermal conductivity. Some equations relating this generalized R-value, also known as the apparent R-value, to other quantities are:
$$R^\prime_\text{val} = \frac{\Delta x}{k^\prime} = \frac{1}{U_\text{val}} = \Delta x \cdot r^\prime ,$$
where:

- $R^\prime_\text{val}$ is the apparent R-value (K/W) across the thickness of the sample,
- $\Delta x$ is the thickness (m) of the sample (measured on a path parallel to the heat flow),
- $k^\prime$ is the apparent thermal conductivity of the material (W/(K⋅m)),
- $U_\text{val}$ is the thermal transmittance or U-value of the material (W/K),
- $r^\prime = {k^\prime}^{-1}$ is the apparent thermal resistivity of the material (K⋅m/W).

An apparent R-value quantifies the physical quantity called thermal insulance.

However, this generalization comes at a price because R-values that include non-conductive processes may no longer be additive and may have significant temperature dependence. In particular, for a loose or porous material, the R-value per inch generally depends on the thickness, almost always so that it decreases with increasing thickness (polyisocyanurate (colloquially, polyiso) being an exception; its R-value/inch increases with thickness). For similar reasons, the R-value per inch also depends on the temperature of the material, usually increasing with decreasing temperature (polyisocyanurate again being an exception); a nominally R-13 fiberglass batt may be R-14 at −12 °C (10 °F) and R-12 at 43 °C (109 °F). Nevertheless, in construction it is common to treat R-values as independent of temperature. Note that an R-value may not account for radiative or convective processes at the material's surface, which may be an important factor for some applications.

The R-value is the reciprocal of the thermal transmittance (U-factor) of a material or assembly. The U.S. construction industry prefers to use R-values, however, because they are additive and because bigger values mean better insulation, neither of which is true for U-factors.

== U-factor/U-value ==
The U-factor or U-value is the overall heat transfer coefficient that describes how well a building element conducts heat or the rate of transfer of heat (in watts) through one square metre of a structure divided by the difference in temperature across the structure. The elements are commonly assemblies of many layers of components such as those that make up walls/floors/roofs etc. It is expressed in watts per meter squared kelvin W/(m^{2}⋅K). This means that the higher the U-value the worse the thermal performance of the building envelope. A low U-value usually indicates high levels of insulation. These values are useful for predicting the composite behavior of an entire building element rather than relying on the properties of individual materials.

In most countries the properties of specific materials (such as insulation) are indicated by the thermal conductivity, sometimes called a k-value or lambda-value (lowercase λ). The thermal conductivity (k-value) is the ability of a material to conduct heat; hence, the lower the k-value, the better the material is for insulation. Expanded polystyrene (EPS) has a k-value of around 0.033 W/(m⋅K). For comparison, phenolic foam insulation has a k-value of around 0.018 W/(m⋅K), while wood varies anywhere from 0.15 to 0.75 W/(m⋅K), and steel has a k-value of approximately 50.0 W/(m⋅K). These figures vary from product to product, so the UK and EU have established a 90/90 standard which means that 90% of the product will conform to the stated k-value with a 90% confidence level so long as the figure quoted is stated as the 90/90 lambda-value.

U is the inverse of R. U is measured in SI units of W/(m^{2}⋅K) and U.S. units of BTU/(h⋅°F⋅ft^{2})
$$U = \frac{1}{R} = \frac{\dot Q_A}{\Delta T} = \frac{k}{L},$$
where $\dot Q_A$ is the heat flux, $\Delta T$ is the temperature difference across the material, k is the material's coefficient of thermal conductivity and L is its thickness. In some contexts, U is referred to as unit surface conductance.

The term U-factor is usually used in the U.S. and Canada to express the heat flow through entire assemblies (such as roofs, walls, and windows). For example, energy codes such as ASHRAE 90.1 and the IECC prescribe U-values. However, R-value is widely used in practice to describe the thermal resistance of insulation products, layers, and most other parts of the building enclosure (walls, floors, roofs). Other areas of the world more commonly use U-value/U-factor for elements of the entire building enclosure including windows, doors, walls, roof, and ground slabs.

== Metric vs. inch-pound ==
The SI (metric) unit of R-value is
kelvin square-metre per watt (K⋅m^{2}/W or, equally, °C⋅m^{2}/W),

whereas the I-P (inch-pound) unit is
degree Fahrenheit square-foot hour per British thermal unit (°F⋅ft^{2}⋅h/BTU).

For R-values there is no difference between U.S. and Imperial units, so the same I-P unit is used in both. Some sources use "RSI" when referring to R-values in SI units. R-values expressed in I-P units are approximately 5.68 times as large as R-values expressed in SI units. For example, a window that is R-2 in the I-P system is about RSI 0.35, since 2/5.68 ≈ 0.35. In countries where the SI system is generally in use, the R-values will also normally be given in SI units. This includes the United Kingdom, Australia, and New Zealand. I-P values are commonly given in the United States and Canada, though in Canada normally both I-P and RSI values are listed. Because the units are usually not explicitly stated, one must decide from context which units are being used. In this regard, it helps to keep in mind that I-P R-values are 5.68 times larger than the corresponding SI R-values.

More precisely,
R-value (in I-P) ≈ RSI-value (in SI) × 5.678263
RSI-value (in SI) ≈ R-value (in I-P) × 0.1761102

== Different insulation types ==
The Australian Government explains that the required total R-values for the building fabric vary depending on climate zone. "Such materials include aerated concrete blocks, hollow expanded polystyrene blocks, straw bales and rendered extruded polystyrene sheets."

In Germany, after the law Energieeinsparverordnung (EnEv) introduced in 2009 (October 10) regarding energy savings, all new buildings must demonstrate an ability to remain within certain boundaries of the U-value for each particular building material. Further, the EnEv describes the maximum coefficient for each new material if parts are replaced or added to standing structures.

The US Department of Energy, and the US Environmental Protection Agency through Energy Star, publish region-specific recommended R-values based on the general local energy costs for heating and cooling, as well as the climate of the region. There are four types of insulation: rolls and batts, loose-fill, rigid foam, and foam-in-place. Rolls and batts are typically flexible insulators that come in fibers, like fiberglass. Loose-fill insulation comes in loose fibers or pellets and should be blown into a space. Rigid foam is more expensive than fiber, but generally has a higher R-value per unit of thickness. Foam-in-place insulation can be blown into small areas to control air leaks, like those around windows, or can be used to insulate an entire house.

== Thickness ==
Increasing the thickness of an insulating layer increases the thermal resistance. For example, doubling the thickness of fiberglass batting will double its R-value, perhaps from 2.0 m^{2}⋅K/W for 110 mm of thickness, up to 4.0 m^{2}⋅K/W for 220 mm of thickness. Heat transfer through an insulating layer is analogous to adding resistance to a series circuit with a fixed voltage. However, this holds only approximately because the effective thermal conductivity of some insulating materials depends on thickness. The addition of materials to enclose the insulation such as drywall and siding provides additional but typically much smaller R-value.

== Factors ==
There are many factors that come into play when using R-values to compute heat loss for a particular wall. Manufacturer R-values apply only to properly installed insulation. Stuffing two layers of batting into the thickness intended for one layer will increase but not double the R-value (essentially, compressing a fiberglass batt decreases the R-value of the batt but increases the R-value per inch).

Another factor is that studs and windows provide a parallel heat conduction path that is unaffected by the insulation's R-value. The practical implication of this is that one could double the R-value of insulation installed between framing members and realize substantially less than a 50 percent reduction in heat loss. When installed between wall studs, even perfect wall insulation only eliminates conduction through the insulation but leaves unaffected the conductive heat loss through such materials as glass windows and studs. Insulation installed between the studs may reduce, but usually does not eliminate, heat losses due to air leakage through the building envelope. Installing a continuous layer of rigid foam insulation on the exterior side of the wall sheathing will interrupt thermal bridging through the studs while also reducing the rate of air leakage.

== Primary role ==
The R-value is a measure of an insulation sample's ability to reduce the rate of heat flow under specified test conditions. The primary mode of heat transfer impeded by insulation is conduction, but insulation also reduces heat loss by all three heat transfer modes: conduction, convection, and radiation. The primary heat loss across an uninsulated air-filled space is natural convection, which occurs because of changes in air density with temperature. Insulation greatly retards natural convection making conduction the primary mode of heat transfer. Porous insulations accomplish this by trapping air so that significant convective heat loss is eliminated, leaving only conduction and minor radiation transfer. The primary role of such insulation is to make the thermal conductivity of the insulation that of trapped, stagnant air. However this cannot be realized fully because the glass wool or foam needed to prevent convection increases the heat conduction compared to that of still air.

The minor radiative heat transfer is obtained by having many surfaces interrupting a "clear view" between the inner and outer surfaces of the insulation such as visible light is interrupted from passing through porous materials. Such multiple surfaces are abundant in batting and porous foam. Radiation is also minimized by low emissivity (highly reflective) exterior surfaces such as aluminum foil. Lower thermal conductivity, or higher R-values, can be achieved by replacing air with argon when practical such as within special closed-pore foam insulation because argon has a lower thermal conductivity than air.

== General ==
Heat transfer through an insulating layer is analogous to electrical resistance. The heat transfers can be worked out by thinking of resistance in series with a fixed potential, except the resistances are thermal resistances and the potential is the difference in temperature from one side of the material to the other. The resistance of each material to heat transfer depends on the specific thermal resistance [R-value]/[unit thickness], which is a property of the material (see table below) and the thickness of that layer. A thermal barrier that is composed of several layers will have several thermal resistors in the analogous with circuits, each in series. Analogous to a set of resistors in parallel, a well insulated wall with a poorly insulated window will allow proportionally more of the heat to go through the (low-R) window, and additional insulation in the wall will only minimally improve the overall R-value. As such, the least well insulated section of a wall will play the largest role in heat transfer relative to its size, similar to the way most current flows through the lowest resistance resistor in a parallel array. Hence ensuring that windows, service breaks (around wires/pipes), doors, and other breaks in a wall are well sealed and insulated is often the most cost effective way to improve the insulation of a structure, once the walls are sufficiently insulated.

Like resistance in electrical circuits, increasing the physical length (for insulation, thickness) of a resistive element, such as graphite for example, increases the resistance linearly; double the thickness of a layer means double the R-value and half the heat transfer; quadruple, quarters; etc. In practice, this linear relationship does not always hold for compressible materials such as glass wool and cotton batting whose thermal properties change when compressed. So, for example, if one layer of fiberglass insulation in an attic provides R-20 thermal resistance, adding on a second layer will not necessarily double the thermal resistance because the first layer will be compressed by the weight of the second.

== Calculating heat loss ==
To find the average heat loss per unit area, simply divide the temperature difference by the R-value for the layer.

If the interior of a home is at 20 °C and the roof cavity is at 10 °C then the temperature difference is 10 °C (or 10 K). Assuming a ceiling insulated to RSI 2.0 (R = 2 m^{2}⋅K/W), energy will be lost at a rate of 10 K / (2 K⋅m^{2}/W) = 5 watts for every square meter (W/m^{2}) of ceiling. The RSI-value used here is for the actual insulating layer (and not per unit thickness of insulation).

== Relationships ==
=== Thickness ===
R-value should not be confused with the intrinsic property of thermal resistivity and its inverse, thermal conductivity. The SI unit of thermal resistivity is K⋅m/W. Thermal conductivity assumes that the heat transfer of the material is linearly related to its thickness.

=== Multiple layers ===
In calculating the R-value of a multi-layered installation, the R-values of the individual layers are added:
R-value_{(outside air film)} + R-value_{(brick)} + R-value_{(sheathing)} + R-value_{(insulation)} + R-value_{(plasterboard)} + R-value_{(inside air film)} = R-value_{(total)}.

To account for other components in a wall such as framing, first calculate the U-value (= 1/R-value) of each component, then the area-weighted average U-value. An average R-value is 1/(average U-value). For example, if 10% of the area is 4 inches of softwood (R-value 5.6) and 90% is 2 inches of silica aerogel (R-value 20), the area-weighted U-value is 0.1/5.6 + 0.9/20 ≈ 0.0629 and the weighted R-value is 1/0.0629 ≈ 15.9.

== Controversy ==
=== Thermal conductivity versus apparent thermal conductivity ===
Thermal conductivity is conventionally defined as the rate of thermal conduction through a material per unit area per unit thickness per unit temperature differential (ΔT). The inverse of conductivity is resistivity (or R per unit thickness). Thermal conductance is the rate of heat flux through a unit area at the installed thickness and any given ΔT.

Experimentally, thermal conduction is measured by placing the material in contact between two conducting plates and measuring the energy flux required to maintain a certain temperature gradient.

For the most part, testing the R-value of insulation is done at a steady temperature, usually about 70 °F (21 °C) with no surrounding air movement. Since these are ideal conditions, the listed R-value for insulation will almost certainly be higher than it would be in actual use, because most situations with insulation are under different conditions

A definition of R-value based on apparent thermal conductivity has been proposed in document C168 published by the American Society for Testing and Materials. This describes heat being transferred by all three mechanisms—conduction, radiation, and convection.

Debate remains among representatives from different segments of the U.S. insulation industry during revision of the U.S. FTC's regulations about advertising R-values illustrating the complexity of the issues.

=== Surface temperature in relationship to mode of heat transfer ===
There are weaknesses to using a single laboratory model to simultaneously assess the properties of a material to resist conducted, radiated, and convective heating. Surface temperature varies depending on the mode of heat transfer. If we assume idealized heat transfer between the air on each side and the surface of the insulation, the surface temperature of the insulator would equal the air temperature on each side. In response to thermal radiation, surface temperature depends on the thermal emissivity of the material. Low-emissivity surfaces such as shiny metal foil will reduce heat transfer by radiation. Convection will alter the rate of heat transfer between the air and the surface of the insulator, depending on the flow characteristics of the air (or other fluid) in contact with it. With multiple modes of heat transfer, the final surface temperature (and hence the observed energy flux and calculated R-value) will be dependent on the relative contributions of radiation, conduction, and convection, even though the total energy contribution remains the same.

This is an important consideration in building construction because heat energy arrives in different forms and proportions. The contribution of radiative and conductive heat sources also varies throughout the year and both are important contributors to thermal comfort

In the hot season, solar radiation predominates as the source of heat gain. According to the Stefan–Boltzmann law, radiative heat transfer is related to the fourth power of the absolute temperature (measured in kelvins: T [K] = T [°C] + 273.16). Therefore, such transfer is at its most significant when the objective is to cool (i.e. when solar radiation has produced very warm surfaces). On the other hand, the conductive and convective heat loss modes play a more significant role during the cooler months. At such lower ambient temperatures the traditional fibrous, plastic and cellulose insulations play by far the major role: the radiative heat transfer component is of far less importance, and the main contribution of the radiation barrier is in its superior air-tightness contribution. In summary: claims for radiant barrier insulation are justifiable at high temperatures, typically when minimizing summer heat transfer; but these claims are not justifiable in traditional winter (keeping-warm) conditions.

=== The limitations of R-values in evaluating radiant barriers ===
Unlike bulk insulators, radiant barriers resist conducted heat poorly. Materials such as reflective foil have a high thermal conductivity and would function poorly as a conductive insulator. Radiant barriers retard heat transfer by two means: by reflecting radiant energy away from its irradiated surface and by reducing the emission of radiation from its opposite side.

The question of how to quantify performance of other systems such as radiant barriers has resulted in controversy and confusion in the building industry with the use of R-values or 'equivalent R-values' for products which have entirely different systems of inhibiting heat transfer. (In the U.S., the federal government's R-value rule establishes a legal definition for the R-value of a building material; the term 'equivalent R-value' has no legal definition and is therefore meaningless.) According to current standards, R-values are most reliably stated for bulk insulation materials. All of the products quoted at the end are examples of these.

Calculating the performance of radiant barriers is more complex. With a good radiant barrier in place, most heat flow is by convection, which depends on many factors other than the radiant barrier itself. Although radiant barriers have high reflectivity (and low emissivity) over a range of electromagnetic spectra (including visible and UV light), their thermal advantages are mainly related to their emissivity in the infra-red range. Emissivity values are the appropriate metric for radiant barriers. Their effectiveness when employed to resist heat gain in limited applications is established, even though R-value does not adequately describe them.

== Deterioration ==
=== Insulation aging ===
While research is lacking on the long-term degradation of R-value in insulation, recent research indicates that the R-values of products may deteriorate over time. For instance, the compaction of loose-fill cellulose creates voids that reduce overall performance; this may be avoided by densely packing at initial installation. Some types of foam insulation, such as polyurethane and polyisocyanurate are blown into form with heavy gases such as chlorofluorocarbons (CFCs) or hydrochlorofluorocarbons (HFCs). However, over time these gases diffuse out of the foam and are replaced by air, thus reducing the effective R-value of the product. There are other foams which do not change significantly with aging because they are blown with water or are open-cell and contain no trapped CFCs or HFCs (e.g., half-pound low-density foams). On certain brands, twenty-year tests have shown no shrinkage or reduction in insulating value.

This has led to controversy as how to rate the insulation of these products. Many manufacturers will rate the R-value at the time of manufacture; critics argue that a more fair assessment would be its settled value. The foam industry adopted the long-term thermal resistance (LTTR) method, which rates the R-value based on a 15-year weighted average. However, the LTTR effectively provides only an eight-year aged R-value, short in the scale of a building that may have a lifespan of 50 to 100 years.

Research has been conducted by the U.S. Army Engineer Research and Development Center on the long-term degradation of insulating materials. Values on the degradation were obtained from short-term laboratory testing on materials exposed to various temperature and humidity conditions. Results indicate that moisture absorption and loss of blowing agent (in closed-cell spray polyurethane foam) were major causes of R-value loss. Fiberglass and extruded polystyrene retained over 97% of their initial R-values while, aerogels and closed-cell polyurethane saw a reduction of 15% and 27.5%, respectively. Results suggest an exponential decay law over time applies to R-values for closed-cell polyurethanes and aerogel blankets.

=== Infiltration ===
Correct attention to air sealing measures and consideration of vapor transfer mechanisms are important for the optimal function of bulk insulators. Air infiltration can allow convective heat transfer or condensation formation, both of which may degrade the performance of an insulation.

One of the primary values of spray-foam insulation is its ability to create an airtight (and in some cases, watertight) seal directly against the substrate to reduce the undesirable effects of air leakage. Other construction technologies are also used to reduce or eliminate infiltration such as air sealing techniques.

== R-value in-situ measurements ==
The deterioration of R-values is especially a problem when defining the energy efficiency of an existing building. Especially in older or historic buildings the R-values defined before construction might be very different from the actual values. This greatly affects energy efficiency analysis. To obtain reliable data, R-values are therefore often determined via U-value measurements at the specific location (in situ). There are several potential methods to this, each with their specific trade-offs: thermography, multiple temperature measurements, and the heat flux method.

=== Thermography ===
Thermography is applied in the building sector to assess the quality of the thermal insulation of a room or building. By means of a thermographic camera thermal bridges and inhomogeneous insulation parts can be identified. However, it does not produce any quantitative data. This method can only be used to approximate the U-value or the inverse R-value.

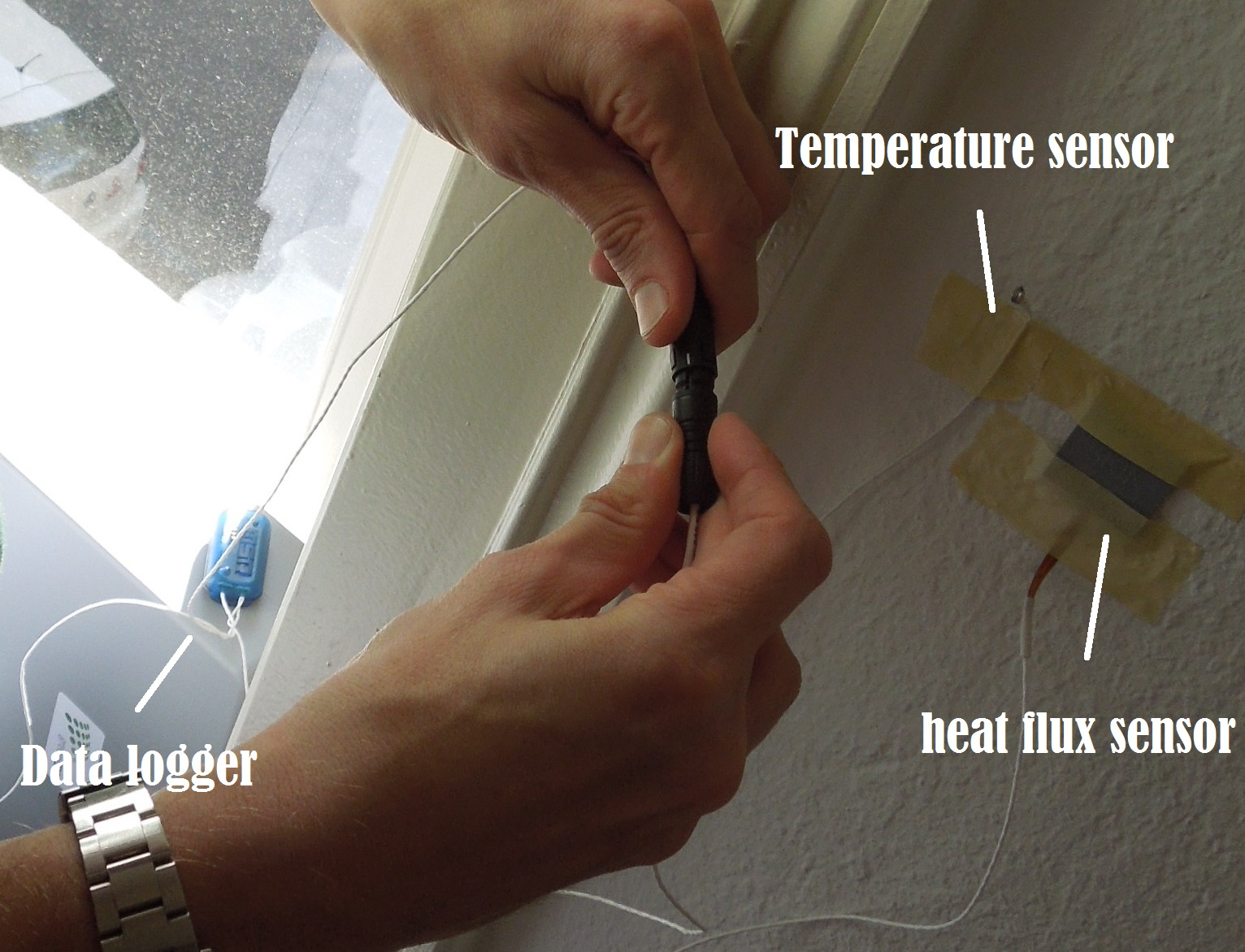
Heat flux measurement set-up

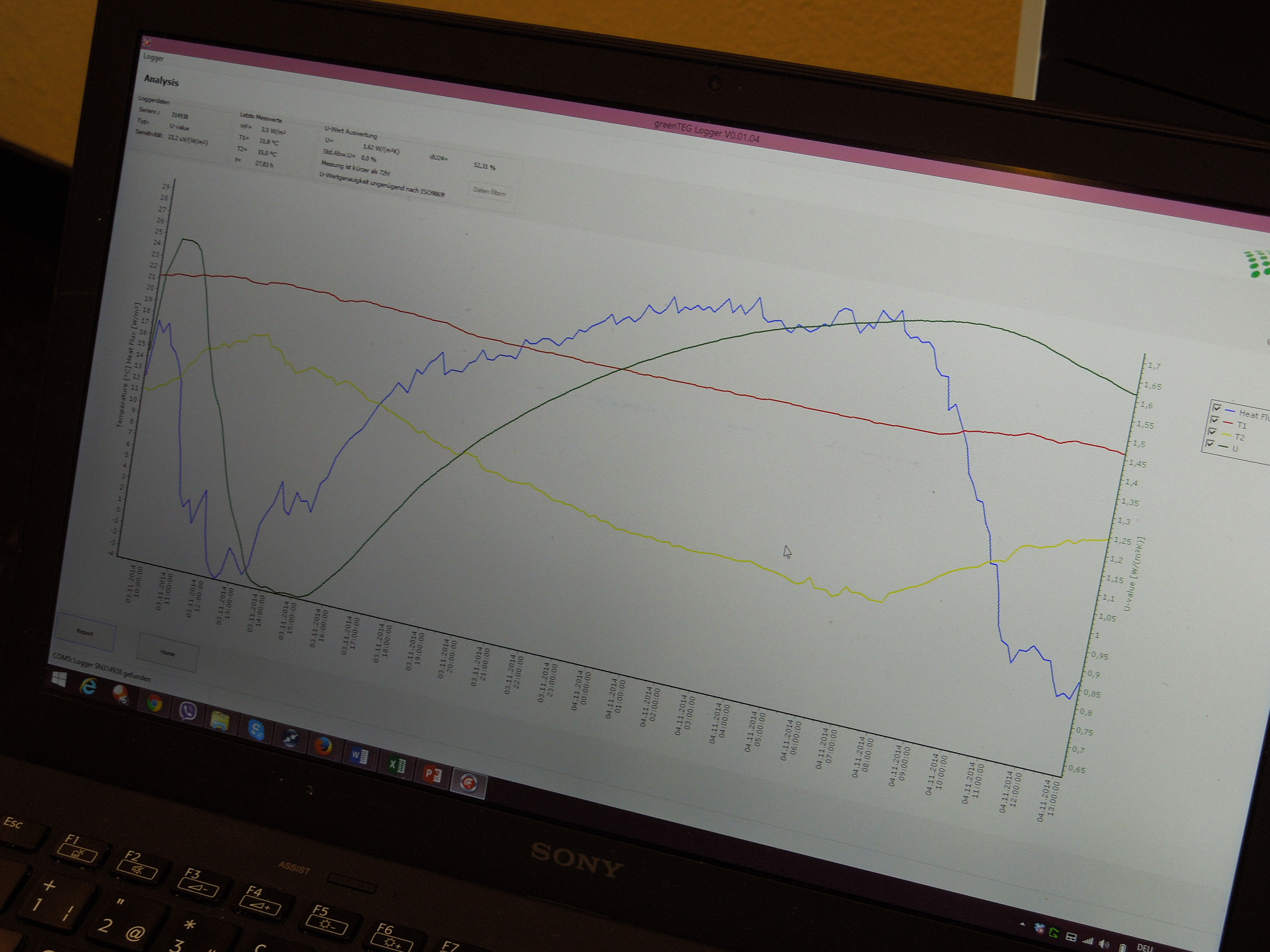
Heat flux measurement results

=== Multiple temperature measurements ===
This approach is based on three or more temperature measurements inside and outside of a building element. By synchronizing these measurements and making some basic assumptions, it is possible to calculate the heat flux indirectly, and thus deriving the U-value of a building element. The following requirements have to be fulfilled for reliable results:

- Difference between inside and outside temperature, ideal > 15 K
- Constant conditions
- No solar radiation
- No radiation heat nearby measurements

=== Heat flux method ===
The R-value of a building element can be determined by using a heat flux sensor in combination with two temperature sensors. By measuring the heat that is flowing through a building element and combining this with the inside and outside temperature, it is possible to define the R-value precisely. A measurement that lasts at least 72 hours with a temperature difference of at least 5 °C is required for a reliable result according to ISO 9869 norms, but shorter measurement durations give a reliable indication of the R-value as well. The progress of the measurement can be viewed on the laptop via corresponding software and obtained data can be used for further calculations. Measuring devices for such heat flux measurements are offered by companies like FluxTeq, Ahlborn, greenTEG and Hukseflux.

Placing the heat flux sensor on either the inside or outside surface of the building element allows one to determine the heat flux through the heat flux sensor as a representative value for the heat flux through the building element. The heat flux through the heat flux sensor is the rate of heat flow through the heat flux sensor divided by the surface area of the heat flux sensor. Placing the temperature sensors on the inside and outside surfaces of the building element allows one to determine the inside surface temperature, outside surface temperature, and the temperature difference between them. In some cases the heat flux sensor itself can serve as one of the temperature sensors. The R-value for the building element is the temperature difference between the two temperature sensors divided by the heat flux through the heat flux sensor. The mathematical formula is:
$$R_\text{val} = \frac{\Delta T}{\phi_q} = \frac{T_o - T_i}{q/A},$$
where:

- $R_\text{val}$ is the R-value (K⋅W^{−1}⋅m^{2}),
- $\phi_q$ is the heat flux (W⋅m^{−2}),
- $A$ is the surface area of the heat flux sensor (m^{2}),
- $q$ is the rate of heat flow (W),
- $T_i$ is the inside surface temperature (K),
- $T_o$ is the outside surface temperature (K), and
- $\Delta T$ is the temperature difference (K) between the inside and outside surfaces.

The U-value can be calculated as well by taking the reciprocal of the R-value. That is,
$$U_\text{val} = \frac{1}{R_\text{val}}.$$

where $U_\text{val}$ is the U-value (W⋅m^{−2}⋅K^{−1}).

The derived R-value and U-value may be accurate to the extent that the heat flux through the heat flux sensor equals the heat flux through the building element. Recording all of the available data allows one to study the dependence of the R-value and U-value on factors like the inside temperature, outside temperature, or position of the heat flux sensor. To the extent that all heat transfer processes (conduction, convection, and radiation) contribute to the measurements, the derived R-value represents an apparent R-value.

== Sample values ==
Vacuum insulated panels have the highest R-value, approximately R-45 (in U.S. units) per inch; aerogel has the next highest R-value (about R-10 to R-30 per inch), followed by polyurethane (PUR) and phenolic foam insulations with R-7 per inch. They are followed closely by polyisocyanurate (PIR) at R-5.8, graphite impregnated expanded polystyrene at R-5, and expanded polystyrene (EPS) at R-4 per inch. Loose cellulose, fibreglass (both blown and in batts), and rock wool (both blown and in batts) all possess an R-value of roughly R-2.5 to R-4 per inch.

Straw bales perform at about R-2.38 to 2.68 per inch, depending on orientation of the bales. However, typical straw bale houses have very thick walls and thus are well insulated. Snow is roughly R-1 per inch. Brick has a very poor insulating ability at a mere R-0.2 per inch; however it does have a relatively good thermal mass.

Note that the above examples all use the U.S. (non-SI) definition for R-value.

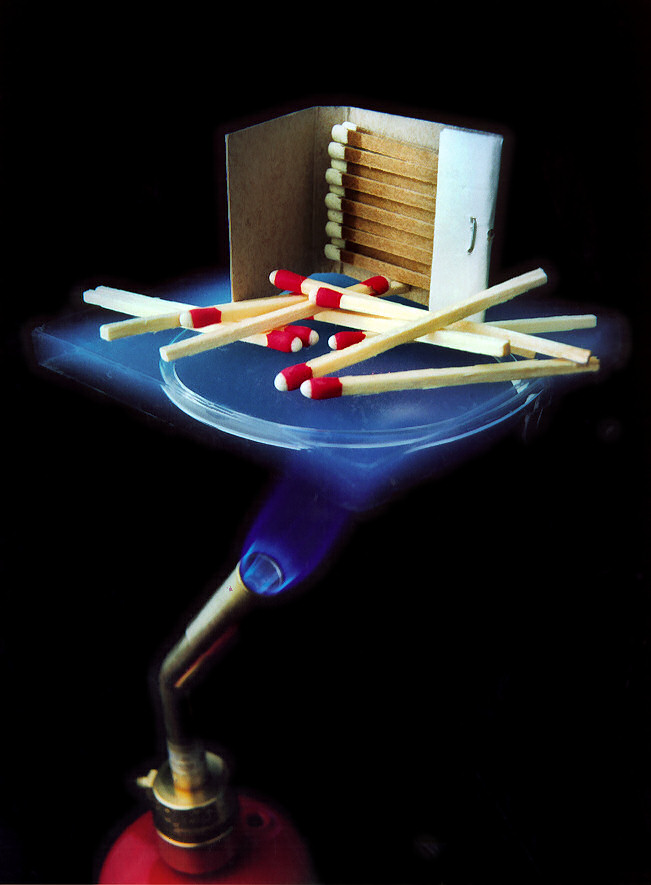
Aerogel is an extremely good thermal insulator, which at a pressure of one-tenth of an atmosphere has an R-value of R-40/m, compared to R-3.5/m for a fiberglass blanket.

=== Typical R-values ===
This is a list of insulation materials used around the world.

Typical R-values are given for various materials and structures as approximations based on the average of available figures and are sorted by lowest value. R-value at 1 m gives R-values normalised to a 1 metre (3 ft 3 in) thickness and sorts by median value of the range.

Material	Thickness		R-value		R-value at 1 m (m^{2}·K/W)
Material	(cm)	(in)	(m^{2}·K/W)	(ft^{2}·°F·h/BTU)	R-value at 1 m (m^{2}·K/W)
Vacuum insulated panel	2.54	1	5.28–8.8	14–66	208–346
Silica aerogel	2.54	1	1.76	10.3	69
Polyurethane rigid panel (CFC/HCFC-expanded) initial	2.54	1	1.23–1.41	7–8	48–56
Polyurethane rigid panel (CFC/HCFC-expanded) aged 5–10 years	2.54	1	1.10	6.25	43
Polyurethane rigid panel (pentane-expanded) initial	2.54	1	1.20	6.8	47
Polyurethane rigid panel (pentane-expanded) aged 5–10 years	2.54	1	0.97	5.5	38
Foil-faced polyurethane rigid panel (pentane-expanded)	2.54	1	1.1–1.2		45–48
Foil-faced polyisocyanurate rigid panel (pentane-expanded) initial	2.54	1	1.20	6.8	55
Foil-faced polyisocyanurate rigid panel (pentane-expanded) aged 5–10 years	2.54	1	0.97	5.5	38
Polyisocyanurate spray foam	2.54	1	0.76–1.46	4.3–8.3	30–57
Closed-cell polyurethane spray foam	2.54	1	0.97–1.14	5.5–6.5	38–45
Phenolic spray foam	2.54	1	0.85–1.23	4.8–7	33–48
Thinsulate clothing insulation	2.54	1	0.28–0.51	1.6–2.9	11–20
Urea-formaldehyde panels	2.54	1	0.88–1.06	5–6	35–42
Drywall	2.54	1	0.15	.9	6.2
Urea foam	2.54	1	0.92	5.25	36.4
Extruded expanded polystyrene (XPS) high-density	2.54	1	0.88–0.95	5–5.4	26–40
Polystyrene board	2.54	1	0.88	5.00	35
Phenolic rigid panel	2.54	1	0.70–0.88	4–5	28–35
Urea-formaldehyde foam	2.54	1	0.70–0.81	4–4.6	28–32
High-density fiberglass batts	2.54	1	0.63–0.88	3.6–5	25–35
Extruded expanded polystyrene (XPS) low-density	2.54	1	0.63–0.82	3.6–4.7	25–32
Icynene loose-fill (pour-fill)	2.54	1	0.70	4	28
Molded expanded polystyrene (EPS) high-density	2.54	1	0.70	4.2	22–32
Rice hulls	2.54	1	0.50	3.0	24
Fiberglass batts	2.54	1	0.55–0.76	3.1–4.3	22–30
Cotton batts (blue jean insulation)	2.54	1	0.65	3.7	26
Molded expanded polystyrene (EPS) low-density	2.54	1	0.65	3.85	26
Sheep's wool batt	2.54	1	0.65	3.7	26
Icynene spray	2.54	1	0.63	3.6	25
Open-cell polyurethane spray foam	2.54	1	0.63	3.6	25
Cardboard	2.54	1	0.52–0.7	3–4	20–28
Rock and slag wool batts	2.54	1	0.52–0.68	3–3.85	20–27
Cellulose loose-fill	2.54	1	0.52–0.67	3–3.8	20–26
Cellulose wet-spray	2.54	1	0.52–0.67	3–3.8	20–26
Rock and slag wool loose-fill	2.54	1	0.44–0.65	2.5–3.7	17–26
Fiberglass loose-fill	2.54	1	0.44–0.65	2.5–3.7	17–26
Polyethylene foam	2.54	1	0.52	3	20
Cementitious foam	2.54	1	0.35–0.69	2–3.9	14–27
Perlite loose-fill	2.54	1	0.48	2.7	19
Wood panels, such as sheathing	2.54	1	0.44	2.5	17 (9)
Fiberglass rigid panel	2.54	1	0.44	2.5	17
Vermiculite loose-fill	2.54	1	0.38–0.42	2.13–2.4	15–17
Vermiculite	2.54	1	0.38	2.13	16–17
Straw bale	2.54	1	0.26	1.45	16–22
Papercrete	2.54	1		2.6–3.2	18–22
Softwood (most)	2.54	1	0.25	1.41	7.7
Wood chips and other loose-fill wood products	2.54	1	0.18	1	7.1
Aerated/cellular concrete (5% moisture)	2.54	1	0.18	1	7.1
Snow	2.54	1	0.18	1	7.1
Hardwood (most)	2.54	1	0.12	0.71	5.5
Brick	2.54	1	0.030	0.2	1.3–1.8
Glass	2.54	1	0.025	0.14	0.98
Uninsulated glass pane	0.6	0.25	0.16	0.91	0.98
Insulated glass (double glazed)	1.6–1.9	0.63–0.75	0.35	2	40
Insulated glass (double glazed, hard low-e)	1.6–1.9	0.63–0.75	0.67	3.8	77
Insulated glass (double glazed, soft low-e)	1.6–1.9	0.63–0.75	0.90	5.11	100
Insulated glass (triple glazed)	3.2–3.8	1.2–1.5	0.67	3.8	40
Poured concrete	2.54	1	0.014	0.08	0.43–0.87
Material	Thickness		R-value		R-value at 1 m (m^{2}·K/W)
Material	(cm)	(in)	(m^{2}·K/W)	(ft^{2}·°F·h/BTU)	R-value at 1 m (m^{2}·K/W)

=== Typical R-values for surfaces ===
==== Non-reflective surface R-values for air films ====
When determining the overall thermal resistance of a building assembly such as a wall or roof, the insulating effect of the surface air film is added to the thermal resistance of the other materials.

Surface position	Direction of heat transfer	R_{U.S.} (hr⋅ft^{2}⋅°F/Btu)	R_{SI} (K⋅m^{2}/W)
Horizontal (e.g., a flat ceiling)	Upward (e.g., winter)	0.61	0.11
Horizontal (e.g., a flat ceiling)	Downward (e.g., summer)	0.92	0.16
Vertical (e.g., a wall)	Horizontal	0.68	0.12
Outdoor surface, any position, moving air 6.7 m/s (winter)	Any direction	0.17	0.030
Outdoor surface, any position, moving air 3.4 m/s (summer)	Any direction	0.25	0.044

In practice the above surface values are used for floors, ceilings, and walls in a building, but are not accurate for enclosed air cavities, such as between panes of glass. The effective thermal resistance of an enclosed air cavity is strongly influenced by radiative heat transfer and distance between the two surfaces. See insulated glazing for a comparison of R-values for windows, with some effective R-values that include an air cavity.

==== Radiant barriers ====
Material	Apparent R-value (min.)	Apparent R-value (max.)	Reference
Reflective insulation	Zero (For assembly without adjacent air space.)	R-10.7 (heat transfer down), R-6.7 (heat transfer horizontal), R-5 (heat transfer up) Ask for the R-value tests from the manufacturer for your specific assembly.	

=== R-value rule in the U.S. ===
The Federal Trade Commission (FTC) governs claims about R-values to protect consumers against deceptive and misleading advertising claims. It issued the R-value rule.

The primary purpose of the rule is to ensure that the home insulation marketplace provides this essential pre-purchase information to the consumer. The information gives consumers an opportunity to compare relative insulating efficiencies, to select the product with the greatest efficiency and potential for energy savings, to make a cost-effective purchase and to consider the main variables limiting insulation effectiveness and realization of claimed energy savings.

The rule mandates that specific R-value information for home insulation products be disclosed in certain ads and at the point of sale. The purpose of the R-value disclosure requirement for advertising is to prevent consumers from being misled by certain claims which have a bearing on insulating value. At the point of transaction, some consumers will be able to get the requisite R-value information from the label on the insulation package. However, since the evidence shows that packages are often unavailable for inspection prior to purchase, no labeled information would be available to consumers in many instances. As a result, the Rule requires that a fact sheet be available to consumers for inspection before they make their purchase.

==== Thickness ====
The R-value Rule specifies:

In labels, fact sheets, ads, or other promotional materials, do not give the R-value for one inch or the "R-value per inch" of your product. There are two exceptions:
1. You can do this if you suggest using your product at a one-inch thickness.
2. You can do this if actual test results prove that the R-values per inch of your product does not drop as it gets thicker.

You can list a range of R-value per inch. If you do, you must say exactly how much the R-value drops with greater thickness. You must also add this statement: "The R-value per inch of this insulation varies with thickness. The thicker the insulation, the lower the R-value per inch."

== See also ==
- Building insulation
- Building insulation materials
- Condensation
- Cool roofs
- Heat transfer
- Passivhaus
- Passive solar design
- Sol-air temperature
- Superinsulation
- Thermal bridge
- Thermal comfort
- Thermal conductivity
- Thermal mass
- Thermal transmittance
- Tog (unit)
