= Conductance =

Conductance may refer to:

- Conductance (graph), a measure in graph theory
- Electrical resistance and conductance, the ability for electric charge to flow in a certain path
- Fluid conductance, the ability for fluid to transmit through materials

== See also ==
- Conductivity (disambiguation)
- Thermal conductance (disambiguation)
