= Radiant barrier =

Building material that reduces heat transfer

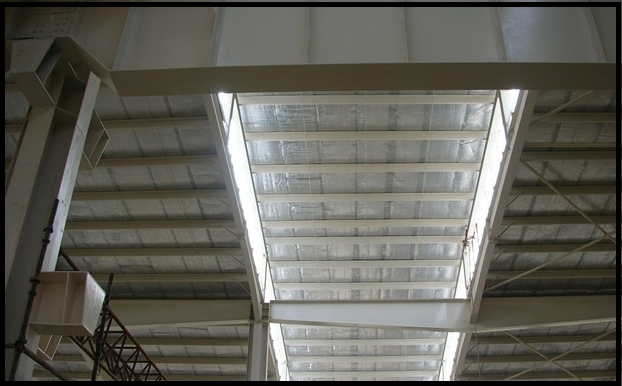
Radiant barrier is a shiny, reflective building material used to reflect heat radiation.

A radiant barrier is a type of building material that reflects thermal radiation and reduces heat transfer. Because thermal energy is also transferred by conduction and convection, in addition to radiation, radiant barriers are often supplemented with thermal insulation that slows down heat transfer by conduction or convection.

A radiant barrier reflects heat radiation (radiant heat), preventing transfer from one side of the barrier to another due to a reflective, low emittance surface. In building applications, this surface is typically a very thin, mirror-like aluminum foil. The foil may be coated for resistance to the elements or for abrasion resistance. The radiant barrier may be one or two sided. One sided radiant barrier may be attached to insulating materials, such as polyisocyanurate, rigid foam, bubble insulation, or oriented strand board (OSB). Reflective tape can be adhered to strips of radiant barrier to make it a contiguous vapor barrier or, alternatively, radiant barrier can be perforated for vapor transmittance.

== Reflectivity and emissivity ==
All materials give off, or emit, energy by thermal radiation as a result of their temperature. The amount of energy radiated depends on the surface temperature and a property called emissivity (also called "emittance"). Emissivity is expressed as a number between zero and one at a given wavelength. The higher the emissivity, the greater the emitted radiation at that wavelength. A related material property is reflectivity (also called "reflectance"). This is a measure of how much energy is reflected by a material at a given wavelength. Reflectivity is also expressed as a number between 0 and 1 (or a percentage between 0 and 100). At a given wavelength and angle of incidence the emissivity and reflectivity values sum to 1 by Kirchhoff's law.

Radiant barrier must have low emissivity (usually 0.1 or less) at the wavelengths at which they are expected to function. For typical building materials, the wavelengths are in the mid- and long-infrared spectrum, in the range of 3-15 micrometres.

Radiant barriers may or may not exhibit high visual reflectivity. While reflectivity and emissivity must sum to 1 at a given wavelength, reflectivity at one set of wavelengths (visible) and emissivity at a different set of wavelengths (thermal) do not necessarily sum to 1. Therefore, it is possible to create visibly dark colored surfaces with low thermal emissivity.

To perform properly, radiant barriers need to face open space (e.g., air or vacuum) through which there would otherwise be radiation.

== History ==
In 1860, the French scientist Jean Claude Eugene Peclet experimented with the insulating effect of high and low emissive metals facing air spaces. Peclet experimented with a wide variety of metals ranging from tin to cast iron, and came to the conclusion that neither the color nor the visual reflectance were significant determining factors in the materials’ performance. Peclet calculated the reduction in BTUs for high and low emissive surfaces facing into various air spaces, discovering the benefits of a radiant barrier in reducing the transfer of heat.

In 1925, two German businessmen Schmidt and Dykerhoff filed for patents on reflective surfaces for use as building insulation because recent improvements in technology allowed low emissivity aluminum foil to be commercially viable. This became the launching pad for radiant barrier and reflective insulation around the world, and within the next 15 years, millions of square feet of radiant barrier were installed in the US alone. Within 30 years, radiant barrier was making a name for itself, and was included in projects at MIT, Princeton, and Frank Sinatra’s residence in Palm Springs, California.

== Applications ==
=== Space exploration ===
For the Apollo program, NASA helped develop a thin aluminum foil that reflected 95% of the radiant heat. A metalized film was used to protect spacecraft, equipment, and astronauts from thermal radiation or to retain heat in the extreme temperature fluctuations of space. The aluminum was vacuum-coated to a thin film and applied to the base of the Apollo landing vehicles. It was also used in numerous other NASA projects like the James Webb Space Telescope and Skylab. In the vacuum of outer space, where temperatures can range from −400 to 250 °F (−240 to 120 °C) heat transfer is only by radiation, so a radiant barrier is much more effective than it is on earth, where 5% to 45% of the heat transfer can still occur via convection and conduction, even when an effective radiant barrier is deployed. Radiant barrier is a Space Foundation Certified Space Technology(TM). Radiant barrier was inducted into the Space Technology Hall of Fame in 1996.

=== Textiles ===
Since the 1970s, sheets of metalized polyester called space blankets have been commercially available as a means to prevent hypothermia and other cold weather injuries. Because of their durability and light weight, these blankets are popular for survival and first aid applications. Swarms of people can be seen draped in reflective metalized film after a marathon, especially where the temperatures are particularly cold, like during the annual New York City Marathon which takes place in the fall.

=== Window treatments ===
Window glass can be coated to achieve low emissivity or "low-e". Some windows use laminate polyester film where at least one layer has been metalized using a process called sputtering. Sputtering occurs when a metal, most often aluminum, is vaporized and the polyester film is passed through it. This process can be adjusted to control the amount of metal that ultimately coats the surface of the film.

These metalized films are applied to one or more surfaces of the glass to resist the transfer of radiant heat, yet the films are so thin that they allow visible light to pass through. Since the thin coatings are fragile and can be damaged when exposed to air and moisture, manufacturers typically use multiple pane windows. While films are typically applied to the glass during manufacturing, some films may be available for homeowners to apply themselves. Homeowner-applied window films are typically expected to last 10–15 years.

== Construction ==
=== Roofs and attics ===
When radiant solar energy strikes a roof, heating the roofing material (shingles, tiles or roofing sheets) and roof sheathing by conduction, it causes the underside of the roof surface and the roof framing to radiate heat downward through the roof space (attic / ceiling cavity) toward the attic floor / upper ceiling surface. When a radiant barrier is placed between the roofing material and the insulation on the attic floor, much of the heat radiated from the hot roof is reflected back toward the roof and the low emissivity of the underside of the radiant barrier means that very little radiant heat is emitted downwards. This makes the top surface of the insulation cooler than it would have been without a radiant barrier and thus reduces the amount of heat that moves through the insulation into the rooms below.

This is different from the "cool roof" strategy which reflects solar energy before it heats the roof, but both are a means of reducing radiant heat. According to a study by the Florida Solar Energy Center, a white tile or white metal cool roof can outperform a traditional black shingle roof with a radiant barrier in the attic, but the black shingle roof with a radiant barrier outperformed the red tile cool roof.

For installing a radiant barrier under a metal or tile roof, the radiant barrier (shiny side down) should not be applied directly over the roof sheathing, because high contact area reduces the efficacy of the metallic surface as low emitter. Vertical battens (aka furring strips) may be applied atop said sheathing; then OSB with a radiant barrier may be put atop the battens. The battens allow more air space than construction without battens. If an air space is not present or is too small, heat will conduct from the radiant barrier, into the substructure, resulting in unwanted IR shower on lower regions. Wood is a poor insulator and so it conducts heat from the radiant barrier to lower surfaces of said wood, where it, in turn, sheds heat by emitting IR radiation. According to the US Department of Energy, “Reflective insulation and radiant barrier products must have an air space adjacent to the reflective material to be effective.”

The most common application for a radiant barrier is as a facing for attics. For a traditional shingle/tile/iron roof, radiant barriers may be applied beneath the rafters or trusses and under the roof decking. This application method has the radiant barrier sheets draped beneath the trusses of rafters, creating a small air space above with the radiant barrier facing into the entire interior attic space below. Reflective foil laminate is a product commonly used as the radiant barrier sheet.

Another method of applying a radiant barrier to a roof in new construction is to use a radiant barrier that is pre-laminated to OSB panels or roof sheathing. Manufacturers of this installation method often tout the savings in labor costs in using a product that serves as roof decking and radiant barrier in one.

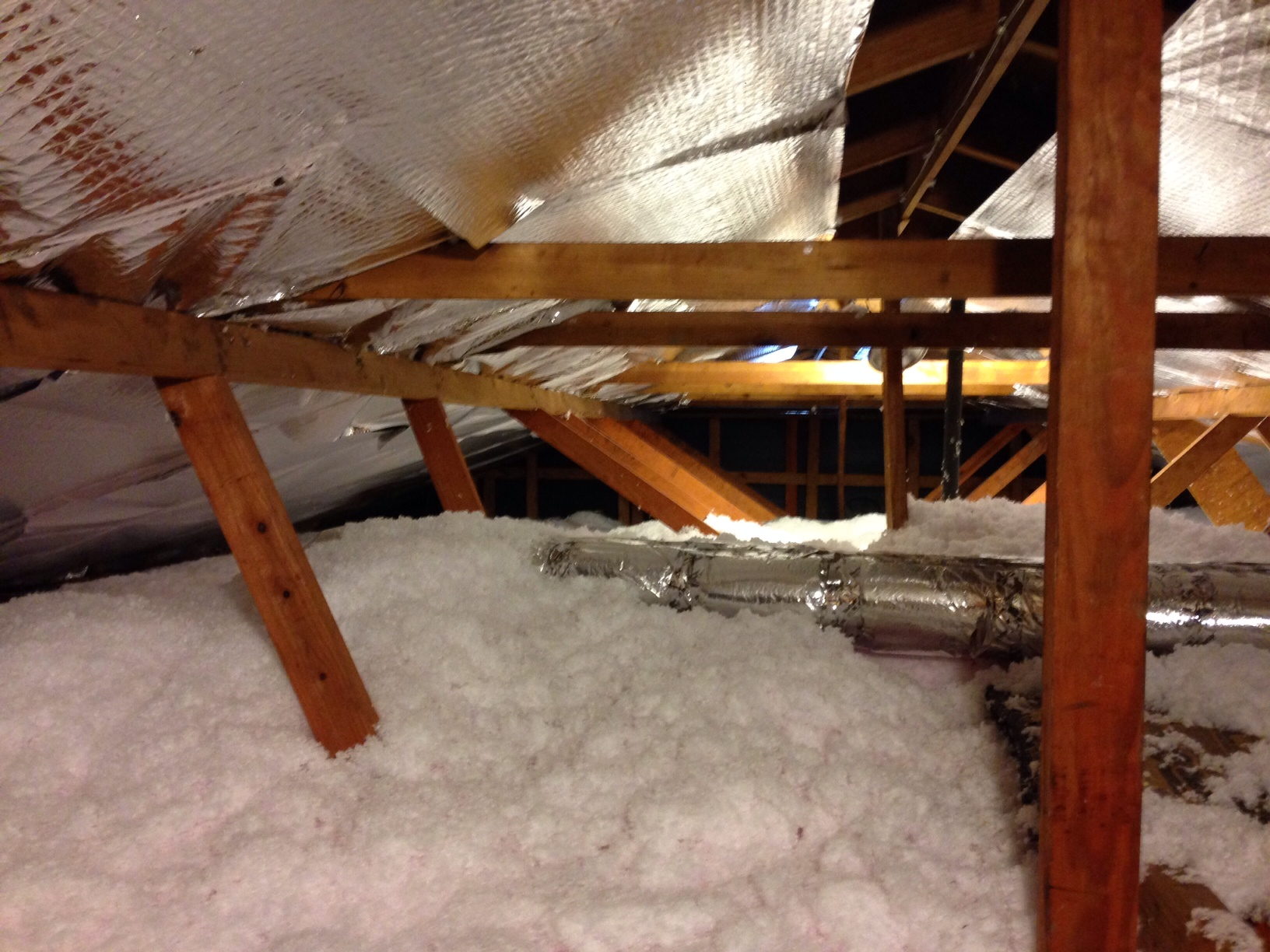
Radiant barrier retrofitted to an existing attic, on the underside of the rafters, and thermal insulation on the attic floor

To apply a radiant barrier in an existing attic, it may be stapled to the underside of the roof rafters. This method offers the same benefits as the draped method in that dual air spaces are provided. However, it is essential that the vents be allowed to remain open to prevent moisture from being trapped in the attic. In general, it is preferred to have the radiant barrier applied SHINY SIDE DOWN to the underside of the roof with an air space facing down; thus dust won't defeat it, as would be the case of a SHINY SIDE UP barrier.

The final method of installing a radiant barrier in an attic is to lay it over the top of the insulation on the attic floor. While this method can be more effective in the winter there are a few potential concerns with this application, which the US Department of Energy and the Reflective Insulation Manufacturers Association International feel the need to address. First, a breathable radiant barrier should always be used here. This is usually achieved by small perforations in the radiant barrier foil. The vapor transmission rate of the radiant barrier should be at least 5 perms, as measured with ASTM E96, and the moisture in the insulation should be checked before installation. Second, the product should meet the required flame spread, which includes ASTM E84 with the ASTM E2599 method. Lastly, this method allows for dust to accumulate over the top surface of the radiant barrier, potentially reducing the efficiency over time.

==== Energy savings ====
According to a 2010 study by the Building Envelope Research Program of the Oak Ridge National Laboratory, homes with air-conditioning duct work in the attic in the hottest climate zones, such as in the US Deep South, could benefit the most from radiant barrier interventions, with annual utility bill savings up to $150, whereas homes in milder climates, e.g., Baltimore, could see savings about half those of their southern neighbors. On the other hand, if there are no ducts or air handlers in the attic, the annual savings could be much less, from about $12 in Miami to $5 in Baltimore. Nevertheless, a radiant barrier may still help to improve comfort and to reduce the peak air-conditioning load.

==== Shingle temperature ====
One common misconception regarding radiant barrier is that the heat reflecting off the radiant barrier back to the roof has the potential to increase the roof temperature and possibly damage the shingles. Performance testing by Florida Solar Energy Center demonstrated that the increase in temperature at the hottest part of the day was no more than about 5 degrees F. In fact, this study showed that a radiant barrier has the potential to decrease the roof temperature once the sun goes down because it prevents heat loss or transfer, from the attic, through the roof. RIMA International wrote a technical paper on the subject which included statements collected from large roofing manufacturers, and none said that a radiant barrier would in any way affect the warranty of the shingles.

==== Attic dust accumulation ====
When laying a radiant barrier over the insulation on the attic floor, it is possible for dust to accumulate on the top side. Many factors like dust particle size, dust composition and the amount of ventilation in the attic affect how dust accumulates and thus the ultimate performance of a radiant barrier in an attic. A study by the Tennessee Valley Authority mechanically applied a small amount of dust over a radiant barrier and found no significant effect when testing for performance. However, TVA referenced a previous study which stated that it was possible for a radiant barrier to collect so much dust that its reflectivity could be decreased by nearly half. It is not true that a double-sided radiant barrier on the attic floor is immune to the dust concern. The TVA study also tested a double-sided radiant barrier with black plastic draped on top to simulate heavy dust accumulation, as well as a single-sided radiant barrier with heavy kraft paper on the top. The test indicated that the radiant barrier was not performing, and the small air spaces created between the peaks of the insulation were not sufficient to block radiant heat.

=== Walls ===
Radiant barrier may be used as a vented skin around the exterior of a wall. Furring strips are applied to the sheathing to create a vented air space between the radiant barrier and the siding, and vents are used at the top and bottom to allow convective heat to rise naturally to the attic. If brick is being used on the exterior, then a vented air space may already be present, and furring strips are not necessary. Wrapping a house with radiant barrier can result in a 10% to 20% reduction in the tonnage air conditioning system requirement, and save both energy and construction costs.

Reflective foil, bubble foil insulations, and radiant barriers are noted for their ability to reflect unwanted solar radiation in hot climates, when applied properly. Reflective foils are fabricated from aluminum foils with a variety of backings such as roofing paper, craft paper, plastic film, polyethylene bubbles, or cardboard. Reflective bubble foil is basically a plastic bubble wrap sheet with a reflective foil layer and belongs to a class of insulation products known as radiant foils. Reflective bubble/foil insulations are primarily radiant barriers, and reflective insulation systems work by reducing radiant heat gain. To be effective, the reflective surface must face an air space; also, dust accumulation on the reflective surface will reduce its reflective capability. The radiant barrier should be installed in a manner to minimize dust accumulation on the reflective surface.

Radiant barriers are more effective in hot climates than in cooler/cold climates (especially when cooling air ducts are located in the attic). When the sun heats a roof, it's primarily the sun's radiant energy that makes the roof hot. Much of this heat travels by conduction through the roofing materials to the attic side of the roof. The hot roof material then radiates its gained heat energy onto the cooler attic surfaces, including the air ducts and the attic floor. A radiant barrier reduces the radiant heat transfer from the underside of the roof to the other surfaces in the attic. Some studies show that radiant barriers can reduce cooling costs 5% to 10% when used in a warm, sunny climate. The reduced heat gain may even allow for a smaller air conditioning system. In cool climates, however, it's usually more cost-effective to install more thermal insulation than to add a radiant barrier.

Both the American Department of Energy (DOE, Energy Efficiency & Renewable Energy Department) and the Ministry of Natural Resources (NRCAN) state that these systems are not recommended for cold or very cold climates.

=== Canada ===
Canada is considered to be a cold climate, so these products do not perform as promoted. Though they are often marketed as offering very high insulating values, there is no specific standard for radiant insulation products, so be wary of posted testimonials and manufacturers’ thermal performance claims. Research has shown that the insulation value of reflective bubble foil insulations and radiant barriers can vary from RSI 0 (R-0) to RSI 0.62 (R-3.5) per thickness of material. A study conducted by CMHC (Canada Mortgage & Housing Corporation) on four homes in Paris, ON found that the performance of the bubble foil was similar to an uninsulated floor. It also performed a cost-benefit analysis, and the cost-benefit ratio was $12 to $13 per cubic metre RSI.

The effective insulating value depends on the number of adjacent dead air spaces, layers of foil and where they are installed. If the foil is laminated to rigid foam insulation, the total insulating value is obtained by adding the RSI of the foam insulation to the RSI of the dead air space and the foil. If there is no air space or clear bubble layer, the RSI value of the film is zero.

== See also ==
- Aluminized cloth
- Bivouac sack
- Cool Roof
- Emissivity
- Fire proximity suit
- Interior radiation control coating
- Kapton
- Low emissivity
- R-value
- Space blanket
- Thermal insulation
- Thin-film deposition
