= Heat rate =

The term heat rate may refer to:

- Heat capacity rate
- Heat transfer, measured by "Heat transfer rate"
- Rate of heat flow, or "Heat flow rate"
- Heat rate (efficiency), a performance parameter for power stations
