= Rate of flow =

Rate of flow may refer to:

- Mass flow rate, the movement of mass per time
- Volumetric flow rate, the volume of a fluid which passes through a given surface per unit of time
- Heat flow rate, the movement of heat per time
