= Seichi Konzo =

Professor of engineering at the UIUC

Seichi "Bud" Konzo (1905–1992) was a professor of engineering at the University of Illinois at Urbana-Champaign from 1929–1971 and a pioneer in the field of home heating and cooling. He lived in the first air-conditioned house in North America in 1933. His research spanned the decades of the 1920s to the 1990s.

Konzo was a central participant in the Small Homes Council, an influential research unit established at the University of Illinois in 1944 to improve the state of the art in home building. (The Small Homes Council was renamed the Building Research Council in 1993.) With the Small Homes Council, Konzo helped to create numerous circular publications.

In 1974 he contributed to the Illinois Lo-Cal House, which was a landmark prototype structure in the history of superinsulation.

== Bibliography ==
Konzo published more than 100 technical papers and books as author or co-author, including:

- "Building Insulation: Types and Applications", 1939
- Summer Air Conditioning, 1958
- Winter Air Conditioning, 1958
- The Quiet Indoor Revolution, 1992

== Awards ==
- Fellow of ASHRAE
- E.K. Campbell Award of Merit, ASHRAE, 1967, "to honor outstanding service and achievement in teaching"
- F. Paul Anderson Medal, ASHRAE, 1973, "for notable scientific achievement or outstanding services performed in the field of heating, ventilating, or air conditioning."
