= Rigid panel =

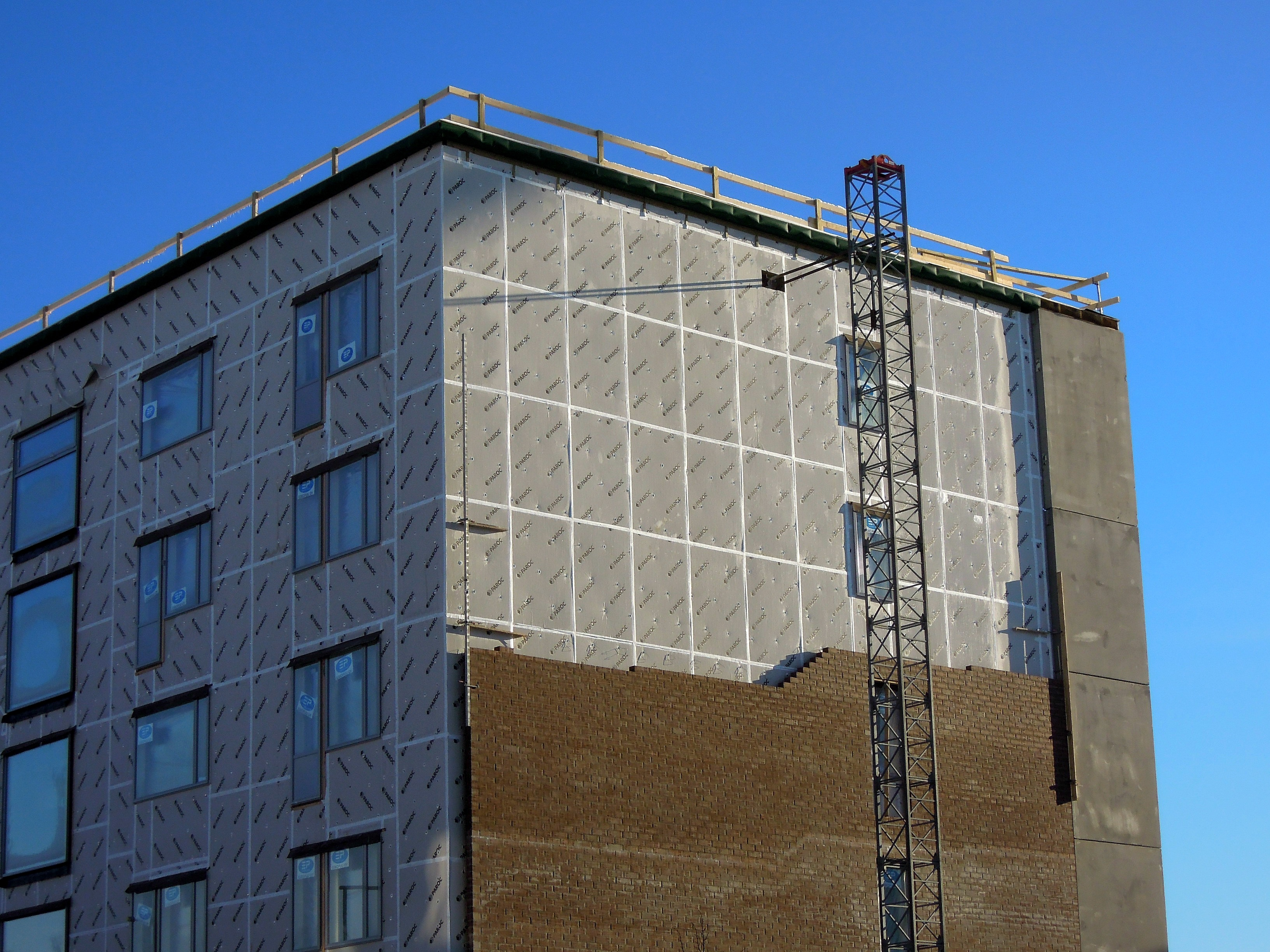
A multi-family residential building under construction with rigid panel exterior insulating sheathing

Rigid panel insulation, also referred to as continuous insulation, can be made from foam plastics such as polyurethane (PUR), polyisocyanurate (PIR), and polystyrene, or from fibrous materials such as fiberglass, rock and slag wool. Rigid panel continuous insulation is often used to provide a thermal break in the building envelope, thus reducing thermal bridging.

== Application ==
Where rigid panels are most often used:

- Some, such as expanded polystyrene (EPS) "beadboard", are suitable for ground contact and are used against footings and exterior backfilled foundation walls.
- Either above or below roof sheathing in a roof assembly.
- Against exterior exposed foundation walls (should be coated to protect from sunlight).
- Against exterior walls between foundation and roof, installed between sheathing and siding.
- On the exterior side of the studs in a framed wall assembly, or on the exterior side of a mass wall assembly.
- Inside unfinished interior walls, either as pre-cut batts, or as panels cut to fit inside walls and secured in place.

== Advantages ==
- It has a high R-value per unit thickness. This material is useful where space is tight or cramped, such as cathedral ceiling.
- It adds to the walls' structural strength.
- It provides acoustic insulation in addition to thermal.
- Most forms of rigid board can be cut with utility knives.
- Protect foundation and damp-proofing during backfilling.
- It is lightweight and strong, although EPS can be crumbly.
- They are all are water resistant, some more so than others (but none should face prolonged exposure to water).
- They will not rot.
- Extruded polystyrene (XPS) type highly resists air infiltration. It is virtually airtight if installed without gaps between adjacent panels, taping the seams.
- It reduces heat conduction through the wall frame when used as sheathing.
- Rigid panels with a radiant heat barrier facing foil will significantly improve the insulating properties by reflecting infrared solar energy before penetrating the wall or ceiling.
- Some types use some recycled content.

== Disadvantages ==
- All are susceptible to UV damage and solvents. Building codes require exterior cladding (e.g. stucco) where they are above ground and exposed.
- Most are flammable and produce toxic fumes when they burn. All of them should be covered with fire-rated drywall (gypsum board) when installed in the interior of a house, unless they have a low flame spread rating (below 25).
- More expensive than most other types of insulation.
- Some types may be susceptible to termites using them for nesting purposes.
- May have R-values higher than that of still air, if some type of insulating gas was blown into them during manufacturing. For many years, manufacturers used chlorofluorocarbons (CFCs) or urea-formaldehyde as blowing agents. These blowing agents eventually leak out of the panels. CFCs deplete the ozone layer, and formaldehyde is toxic. Some manufacturers still use Hydrochlorofluorocarbons (HCFCs) which are still harmful to the ozone layer, but not to the same extent as CFCs. As the blowing agent leaks, air replaces the insulating gas, and the R-value of the panel drops.
- Most rigid panels are made from crude oil byproducts, and some toxic pollution results during their manufacture.
- Many species of ants will burrow into foam to build their nests.

== Classification ==
- Fiberglass and rock wool. These are mainly used for acoustic applications and as insulation.
- Perlite – used in Europe
- Phenolic, also known as phenol-formaldehyde. Advantages: High strength. Less flammable than most other foams. Disadvantages: Material is mostly open-celled. This results in insulating capacity not as good as other foams, high water absorption, and high water vapor permeability. Degrades and releases some formaldehyde over time, but not nearly as much as urea formaldehyde.
- Polyurethane. White or yellow. Produced through mixing of isocyanate and polyether in presence of catalyst and blowing agent. Contains many tiny, closed cells. Relatively waterproof, and low water absorption, but must protect from prolonged exposure to water. Can use underground if conditions are relatively dry.
- Rigid cellular polystyrene (RCPS). This includes extruded polystyrene foam XPS (such as Styrofoam and commonly referred to as "blue board," expanded polystyrene foam EPS (commonly referred to as "beadboard"), and MEPS.
- Polyisocyanurate (also known as polyiso). More stable at high temperatures and less flammable than polyurethane. Higher R-value vs. polystyrene and polyurethane due to its gas-filled closed-cell foam structure. Denser and more rigid than polystyrene panels, but more expensive. Must protect from prolonged exposure to water. It usually contains some recycled plastic, such as from PET beverage containers.
- Structural insulated panels (SIPs), also called stressed-skin walls.
- Vacuum insulation consisting of thin panels with extreme insulation capacities, as high as R-50 per unit thickness. However, like double-glazed windows, these eventually lose their air-tight seal.
- Natural fiber insulations (around 0.04 W/mK) all can be treated with low toxicity fire and insect retardants, often used in Europe
- Lightweight wood fiber board.
- Cork

== More details ==
There are many types of rigid cellular polystyrene (RCPS). The term "Styrofoam" is The Dow Chemical Company's brand name, which does not refer to any particular type of RCPS. Some polystyrene uses up to 50% recycled resin, including post-consumer plastic. Several states in the US have banned polystyrene that uses CFCs as blowing agents.

- Molded expanded polystyrene, also known as MEPS, EPS, or beadboard, consists of many tiny foam beads molded and pressed together. EPS is manufactured in low-density and high-density versions. Low-density EPS is relatively inexpensive, resistant to the effects of moisture, and can be used underground. High-density EPS is even more moisture-resistant, and is manufactured for use on exterior foundation walls and burial against footings, if the soil is relatively dry. EPS typically uses pentane as a blowing agent, avoiding the high global warming potential of CFCs, HCFCs and HFCs, as well as the ozone depletion potential of CFC and HCFCs.
- Extruded polystyrene, also known as XPS, or blueboard, has a smooth, cut-cell surface, is stronger than EPS, and is ideal for blocking air-infiltration. Dow Chemical colors their XPS blue and markets it under their global recognized brand "Styrofoam". Like EPS, XPS is also manufactured in low-density and high-density versions. High-density XPS is used for foundation slabs, concrete floors, roofs, and other applications that require higher bearing strength than EPS and low-density XPS. XPS typically uses HCFCs as blowing agents, which have high global warming potential and moderate ozone depletion potential, or HFCs which have high global warming potential even though they have zero ozone depletion potential.

== See also ==
- Window insulation film
- Asbestos insulating board
