= List of insulation materials =

This is a list of insulation materials used around the world.

Typical R-values are given for various materials and structures as approximations based on the average of available figures and are sorted by lowest value. R-value at 1 m gives R-values normalised to a 1 metre (3 ft 3 in) thickness and sorts by median value of the range.

Material	Thickness		R-value		R-value at 1 m (m^{2}·K/W)
Material	(cm)	(in)	(m^{2}·K/W)	(ft^{2}·°F·h/BTU)	R-value at 1 m (m^{2}·K/W)
Vacuum insulated panel	2.54	1	5.28–8.8	14–66	208–346
Silica aerogel	2.54	1	1.76	10.3	69
Polyurethane rigid panel (CFC/HCFC-expanded) initial	2.54	1	1.23–1.41	7–8	48–56
Polyurethane rigid panel (CFC/HCFC-expanded) aged 5–10 years	2.54	1	1.10	6.25	43
Polyurethane rigid panel (pentane-expanded) initial	2.54	1	1.20	6.8	47
Polyurethane rigid panel (pentane-expanded) aged 5–10 years	2.54	1	0.97	5.5	38
Foil-faced polyurethane rigid panel (pentane-expanded)	2.54	1	1.1–1.2		45–48
Foil-faced polyisocyanurate rigid panel (pentane-expanded) initial	2.54	1	1.20	6.8	55
Foil-faced polyisocyanurate rigid panel (pentane-expanded) aged 5–10 years	2.54	1	0.97	5.5	38
Polyisocyanurate spray foam	2.54	1	0.76–1.46	4.3–8.3	30–57
Closed-cell polyurethane spray foam	2.54	1	0.97–1.14	5.5–6.5	38–45
Phenolic spray foam	2.54	1	0.85–1.23	4.8–7	33–48
Thinsulate clothing insulation	2.54	1	0.28–0.51	1.6–2.9	11–20
Urea-formaldehyde panels	2.54	1	0.88–1.06	5–6	35–42
Drywall	2.54	1	0.15	.9	6.2
Urea foam	2.54	1	0.92	5.25	36.4
Extruded expanded polystyrene (XPS) high-density	2.54	1	0.88–0.95	5–5.4	26–40
Polystyrene board	2.54	1	0.88	5.00	35
Phenolic rigid panel	2.54	1	0.70–0.88	4–5	28–35
Urea-formaldehyde foam	2.54	1	0.70–0.81	4–4.6	28–32
High-density fiberglass batts	2.54	1	0.63–0.88	3.6–5	25–35
Extruded expanded polystyrene (XPS) low-density	2.54	1	0.63–0.82	3.6–4.7	25–32
Icynene loose-fill (pour-fill)	2.54	1	0.70	4	28
Molded expanded polystyrene (EPS) high-density	2.54	1	0.70	4.2	22–32
Rice hulls	2.54	1	0.50	3.0	24
Fiberglass batts	2.54	1	0.55–0.76	3.1–4.3	22–30
Cotton batts (blue jean insulation)	2.54	1	0.65	3.7	26
Molded expanded polystyrene (EPS) low-density	2.54	1	0.65	3.85	26
Sheep's wool batt	2.54	1	0.65	3.7	26
Icynene spray	2.54	1	0.63	3.6	25
Open-cell polyurethane spray foam	2.54	1	0.63	3.6	25
Cardboard	2.54	1	0.52–0.7	3–4	20–28
Rock and slag wool batts	2.54	1	0.52–0.68	3–3.85	20–27
Cellulose loose-fill	2.54	1	0.52–0.67	3–3.8	20–26
Cellulose wet-spray	2.54	1	0.52–0.67	3–3.8	20–26
Rock and slag wool loose-fill	2.54	1	0.44–0.65	2.5–3.7	17–26
Fiberglass loose-fill	2.54	1	0.44–0.65	2.5–3.7	17–26
Polyethylene foam	2.54	1	0.52	3	20
Cementitious foam	2.54	1	0.35–0.69	2–3.9	14–27
Perlite loose-fill	2.54	1	0.48	2.7	19
Wood panels, such as sheathing	2.54	1	0.44	2.5	17 (9)
Fiberglass rigid panel	2.54	1	0.44	2.5	17
Vermiculite loose-fill	2.54	1	0.38–0.42	2.13–2.4	15–17
Vermiculite	2.54	1	0.38	2.13	16–17
Straw bale	2.54	1	0.26	1.45	16–22
Papercrete	2.54	1		2.6–3.2	18–22
Softwood (most)	2.54	1	0.25	1.41	7.7
Wood chips and other loose-fill wood products	2.54	1	0.18	1	7.1
Aerated/cellular concrete (5% moisture)	2.54	1	0.18	1	7.1
Snow	2.54	1	0.18	1	7.1
Hardwood (most)	2.54	1	0.12	0.71	5.5
Brick	2.54	1	0.030	0.2	1.3–1.8
Glass	2.54	1	0.025	0.14	0.98
Uninsulated glass pane	0.6	0.25	0.16	0.91	0.98
Insulated glass (double glazed)	1.6–1.9	0.63–0.75	0.35	2	40
Insulated glass (double glazed, hard low-e)	1.6–1.9	0.63–0.75	0.67	3.8	77
Insulated glass (double glazed, soft low-e)	1.6–1.9	0.63–0.75	0.90	5.11	100
Insulated glass (triple glazed)	3.2–3.8	1.2–1.5	0.67	3.8	40
Poured concrete	2.54	1	0.014	0.08	0.43–0.87
Material	Thickness		R-value		R-value at 1 m (m^{2}·K/W)
Material	(cm)	(in)	(m^{2}·K/W)	(ft^{2}·°F·h/BTU)	R-value at 1 m (m^{2}·K/W)
