= Beadboard =

Beadboard may refer to:

- A rigid panel made from molded expanded polystyrene foam (MEPS/EPS)
- A type of panelling made from tongue-and-groove boards
