= Super-insulation systems =

Super-insulation systems may refer to:

- Superinsulation, for houses
- Multi-layer insulation, for spacecraft
