= Thermal conductance =

For Thermal conductance see:

- Thermal contact conductance
- Thermal conduction
- Thermal conductivity
- List of thermal conductivities
- Thermal conductance and resistance
