= Interior radiation control coating =

Interior Radiation Control Coating Systems (IRCCS), sometimes referred to as radiant barrier coatings, are paints designed to provide thermal insulation to buildings.

== Standards ==
The American Society for Testing and Materials (ASTM) and the Reflective Insulation Manufacturer's Association (RIMA) have established an industry standard for evaluating paints claiming to have insulating characteristics. The energy conserving property has been defined as thermal emittance (the ability of a surface to release radiant energy that it has absorbed). Those coatings qualified as Interior Radiation Control Coatings must show a thermal emittance of 0.25 or less. This means that an IRCCS will block 75% or more of the radiant heat transfer. These low "E" coatings were originally developed in 1978 at the Solar Energy Corporation (SOLEC) in Princeton, New Jersey for use in tubular evacuated solar collectors. The developer, Robert Aresty, designed them to be used as low emissivity surfaces on glass to replace vacuum deposited surfaces. While SOLEC was doing collaborative work with the Florida Solar Energy Center (FSEC), Phillip Fairey, research director at FSEC and world-renowned researcher in radiant barriers discovered the availability of these coatings in the SOLEC labs. He immediately grasped that they might be used as a replacement for foil radiant barriers, and proceeded to perform experiments verifying their viability for this use. In 1986 these coatings were applied for the first commercial application in homes built by Centex Corporation.

== Uses ==
Uses of IRCCS includes residential and commercial building insulation, as well as industrial and automotive applications.
