= Conductivity =

Conductivity may refer to:

- Electrical conductivity, a measure of a material's ability to conduct an electric current
  - Conductivity (electrolytic), the electrical conductivity of an electrolyte in solution
  - Conductivity (non-aqueous), the electrical conductivity of low- and non-polar liquids
  - Ionic conductivity (solid state), electrical conductivity due to ions moving position in a crystal lattice
- Hydraulic conductivity, a property of a porous material's ability to transmit water
- Thermal conductivity, an intensive property of a material that indicates its ability to conduct heat

== See also ==
- Conductance (disambiguation)
- Superconductivity
