= Superinsulation =

Method of insulating a building

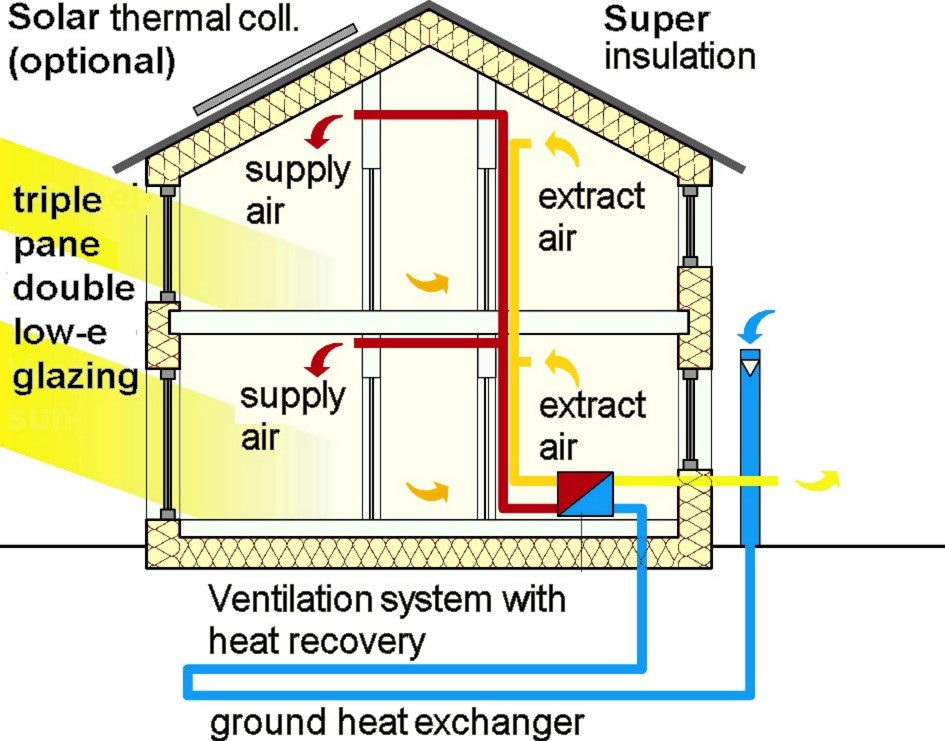
The passivhaus standard combines superinsulation with other techniques and technologies to achieve ultra-low energy use.

Superinsulation is an approach to building design, construction, and retrofitting that dramatically reduces heat loss (and gain) by using much higher insulation levels and airtightness than average. Superinsulation is one of the ancestors of the passive house approach.

== Definition ==
There is no universally agreed definition of superinsulation, but superinsulated buildings typically include:

- Very high levels of insulation, typically R-40 (RSI-7) walls and R-60 (RSI-10.6) roof, corresponding to SI U-values of 0.15 and 0.1 W/(m^{2}·K) respectively)
- Details to ensure insulation continuity where walls meet roofs, foundations, and other walls
- Airtight construction, especially around doors and windows, to prevent air infiltration pushing heat in or out
- Carefully managed air exchange, using a heat recovery ventilation system to provide fresh air rather than uncontrolled air leakage
- Window size and number minimized while meeting functional requirements; in particular, no large windows facing any particular direction
- Much smaller than a conventional heating system, sometimes just a small backup heater

Nisson & Dutt (1985) suggest that a house might be described as "superinsulated" if the cost of space heating is lower than that of water heating.

Besides the meaning mentioned above of high level of insulation, the terms superinsulation and superinsulating materials are in use for high R/inch insulation materials like vacuum insulation panels (VIPs) and aerogel.

== Theory ==
A superinsulated house is intended to reduce heating needs significantly and may even be heated predominantly by intrinsic heat sources (waste heat generated by appliances and the body heat of the occupants) with small amounts of backup heat. This has been demonstrated to work even in frigid climates but requires close attention to construction details in addition to the insulation (see IEA Solar Heating & Cooling Implementing Agreement Task 13).

== History ==
The term "superinsulation" was coined by Wayne Schick at the University of Illinois Urbana–Champaign. In 1976 he was part of a team that developed a design called the "Lo-Cal" house, using computer simulations based on the climate of Madison, Wisconsin. Several houses, duplexes and condominiums based on Lo-Cal principles were built in Champaign–Urbana in the 1970s.

In 1977 the "Saskatchewan House" was built in Regina, Saskatchewan, by a group of Canadian government agencies. It was the first house to demonstrate the value of superinsulation publicly and generated much attention. It originally included some experimental evacuated-tube solar panels, but they were not needed and were later removed. The house was heated primarily by waste heat from appliances and the occupants. In 1977 the "Leger House" was built by Eugene Leger, in East Pepperell, Massachusetts. It had a more conventional appearance than the "Saskatchewan House", and also received extensive publicity. Publicity from the "Saskatchewan House" and the "Leger House" influenced other builders, and many superinsulated houses were built over the next few years. These houses also influenced Wolfgang Feist's development of the Passivhaus standard.

== Retrofits ==
It is possible, and increasingly desirable, to retrofit superinsulation to existing houses or buildings. The easiest way is often to add layers of continuous rigid exterior insulation, and sometimes by building new exterior walls that allow more space for insulation. A vapor barrier can be installed outside the original framing but may not be needed. An improved continuous air barrier is almost always worth adding, as older homes tend to be drafty, and such an air barrier can be significant for energy savings and durability. Care should be exercised when adding a vapor barrier as it can reduce drying of incidental moisture or even cause summer (in climates with humid summers) interstitial condensation and consequent mold and mildew. This may cause health problems for the occupants and may damage the structure. Many builders in northern Canada use a simple 1/3 to 2/3 approach, placing the vapor barrier no further out than 1/3 of the R-value of the insulated portion of the wall. This method is generally valid for interior walls with little or no vapor resistance (e.g., they use fibrous insulation) and controls air leakage condensation and vapor diffusion condensation. This approach will ensure that condensation does not occur on or to the inside of the vapor barrier during cold weather. The 1/3:2/3 rule will ensure that the vapor barrier temperature will not fall below the dew point temperature of the interior air and will minimize the possibility of cold-weather condensation problems.

For example, with an internal room temperature of 20 °C (68 °F), the vapor barrier will then only reach 7.3 °C (45 °F) when the outside temperature is at −18 °C (−1 °F). Indoor air dew point temperatures are more likely to be in the order of around 0 °C (32 °F) when it is that cold outdoors, much lower than the predicted vapor barrier temperature, and hence the 1/3:2/3 rule is quite conservative. For climates that do not often experience −18 °C, the 1/3:2/3 rule should be amended to 40:60 or 50:50. As the interior air dewpoint temperature is an important basis for such rules, buildings with high interior humidities during cold weather (e.g., museums, swimming pools, humidified or poorly ventilated airtight homes) may require different rules, as can buildings with drier interior environments (e.g., highly ventilated buildings and warehouses). The 2009 International Residential Code embodies more sophisticated rules to guide the choice of insulation on the exterior of new homes, which can be applied when retrofitting older homes.

A vapor-permeable building wrap on the outside of the original wall helps keep the wind out and allows the wall assembly to dry to the exterior. Asphalt felt and other products, such as porous polymer-based products, are available for this purpose and usually double as the water-resistant barrier/drainage plane.

Interior retrofits are possible where the owner wants to preserve the old exterior siding or where setback requirements limit space for an exterior retrofit. Sealing the air barrier is more complex, and the thermal insulation continuity is compromised (because of the many partition, floor, and service penetrations); the original wall assembly is rendered colder in cold weather (and hence more prone to condensation and slower to dry), occupants are exposed to significant disruptions, and the house is left with less interior space. Another approach is to use the 1/3 to 2/3 method mentioned above—to install a vapor retarder on the inside of the existing wall (if there is not one already) and add insulation and support structure to the interior. This way, utilities (power, telephone, cable, and plumbing) can be added to the new wall space without penetrating the air barrier. Polyethylene vapor barriers are risky except in frigid climates because they limit the wall's ability to dry to the interior. This approach also limits the amount of interior insulation that can be added to a relatively small amount (e.g., only R-6 insulation can be added to a 2×4 R-12 wall).

== Costs and benefits ==
In new construction, the extra insulation and wall framing cost may be offset by not requiring a dedicated central heating system. A central furnace is often justified or required to ensure sufficiently uniform temperatures in homes with numerous rooms, more than one floor, air conditioning, or large size. Small furnaces are not very expensive, and some ductwork to every room is generally required to provide ventilation air. When peak demand and annual energy use are low, costly and sophisticated central heating systems are only sometimes needed. Hence, even electric resistance heaters may be used. Electric heaters are typically only used on cold winter nights when the overall demand for electricity in the rest of the house is low. Other backup heaters, such as wood pellets, wood stoves, natural gas boilers, or even furnaces, are widely used. The cost of a superinsulation retrofit should be balanced against the future price of heating fuel (which can be expected to fluctuate from year to year due to supply problems, natural disasters, or geopolitical events), the desire to reduce pollution from heating a building, or the desire to provide exceptional thermal comfort.

During a power failure, a superinsulated house stays warm longer as heat loss is much less than usual, but the thermal storage capacity of the structural materials and contents is the same. Adverse weather may hamper efforts to restore power, leading to weeks or more outages. When deprived of their continuous supply of electricity (either for heat directly or to operate gas-fired furnaces), conventional houses cool rapidly and may be at greater risk of costly damage from freezing water pipes. Residents who use supplemental heating methods without proper care during such episodes or at any other time may subject themselves to the risk of fire or carbon monoxide poisoning.

== See also ==
- Building insulation material
- Building insulation
- Earth shelter
- Earthship
- Energy conservation
- Insulating concrete form (ICF)
- Quadruple glazing
- Seasonal thermal energy storage (STES)
- Straw-bale construction
- Structural insulated panel (SIP)
- Zero-energy building
