= Heat capacity rate =

The heat capacity rate is heat transfer terminology used in thermodynamics and different forms of engineering denoting the quantity of heat a flowing fluid of a certain mass flow rate is able to absorb or release per unit temperature change per unit time. It is typically denoted as C, listed from empirical data experimentally determined in various reference works, and is typically stated as a comparison between a hot and a cold fluid, C_{h} and C_{c} either graphically, or as a linearized equation. It is an important quantity in heat exchanger technology common to either heating or cooling systems and needs, and the solution of many real world problems such as the design of disparate items as different as a microprocessor and an internal combustion engine.

== Basis ==
A hot fluid's heat capacity rate can be much greater than, equal to, or much less than the heat capacity rate of the same fluid when cold. In practice, it is most important in specifying heat-exchanger systems, wherein one fluid usually of dissimilar nature is used to cool another fluid such as the hot gases or steam cooled in a power plant by a heat sink from a water source—a case of dissimilar fluids, or for specifying the minimal cooling needs of heat transfer across boundaries, such as in air cooling.

As the ability of a fluid to resist change in temperature itself changes as heat transfer occurs changing its net average instantaneous temperature, it is a quantity of interest in designs which have to compensate for the fact that it varies continuously in a dynamic system. While itself varying, such change must be taken into account when designing a system for overall behavior to stimuli or likely environmental conditions, and in particular the worst-case conditions encountered under the high stresses imposed near the limits of operability— for example, an air-cooled engine in a desert climate on a very hot day.

If the hot fluid had a much larger heat capacity rate, then when hot and cold fluids went through a heat exchanger, the hot fluid would have a very small change in temperature while the cold fluid would heat up a significant amount. If the cool fluid has a much lower heat capacity rate, that is desirable. If they were equal, they would both change more or less temperature equally, assuming equal mass-flow per unit time through a heat exchanger. In practice, a cooling fluid which has both a higher specific heat capacity and a lower heat capacity rate is desirable, accounting for the pervasiveness of water cooling solutions in technology—the polar nature of the water molecule creates some distinct sub-atomic behaviors favorable in practice.

$C=c_p\frac{dm}{dt}$

where C = heat capacity rate of the fluid of interest in W⋅K^{−1},
dm/dt = mass flow rate of the fluid of interest and
c_{p} = specific heat of the fluid of interest.

== See also ==
- Heat
- Heat capacity
- Heat capacity ratio
- Heat equation
- Heat transfer coefficient
- Latent heat
- Specific heat capacity
- Specific melting heat
- Temperature
- Thermodynamics
- Thermodynamic (absolute) temperature
- Thermodynamic equations
- Volumetric heat capacity
