= Vacuum insulated panel =

Manufactured rigid thermal insulation product

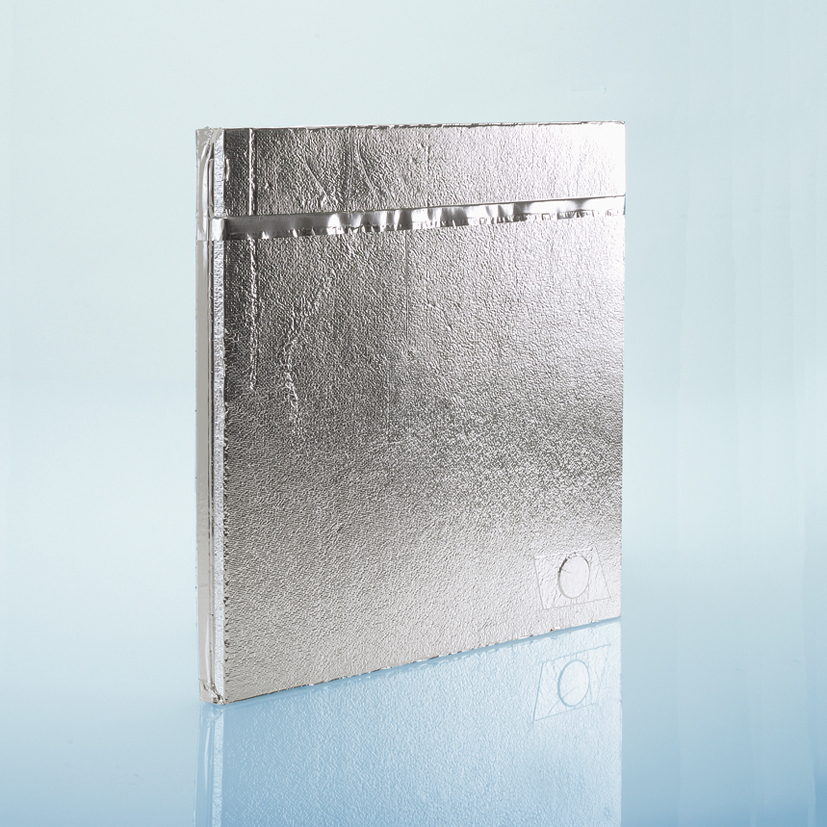

A vacuum insulated panel (VIP) is a form of thermal insulation consisting of a gas-tight enclosure surrounding a rigid core, from which the air has been evacuated. It is used in building construction, refrigeration units, and insulated shipping containers to provide better insulation performance than conventional insulation materials.

== Construction ==
VIPs consist of:

- Membrane walls, used to prevent air from entering the panel.
- A panel of a rigid, highly-porous material, such as fumed silica, aerogel, perlite, or glass fiber, to support the membrane walls against atmospheric pressure once the air is evacuated.
- Chemicals (known as getters) to collect gases leaked through the membrane or offgassed from the membrane materials. These are added to VIPs with glass-fiber or foam cores, because cores with bigger pore size require a higher vacuum (less than about 1 mbar) during the planned service life.

== Thermal performance ==
Heat transfer occurs by three modes: convection, conduction and radiation. Creating a vacuum practically eliminates convection, since this relies on the presence of gas molecules able to transfer heat energy by bulk movement. A small decrease in pressure has no effect on the thermal conductivity of a gas, because the reduction in energy-carrying molecules is offset by a reduction in collisions between molecules. However, at sufficiently low pressure, the distance between collisions exceeds the size of the vessel, and then the conductivity does reduce with pressure.

Since the core material of a VIP is similar in thermal characteristics to materials used in conventional insulation, VIPs therefore achieve a much lower thermal conductivity (k-value) than conventional insulation, or in other words a higher thermal resistance per unit of thickness. Typically, commercially available VIPs achieve a thermal conductivity of 0.004 W/(m·K) across the centre of the panel, or an overall value of 0.006–0.008 W/(m·K) after allowing for thermal bridging (heat conduction across the panel edges) and the inevitable gradual loss of vacuum over time.

== Comparison to conventional insulation ==
The thermal resistance of VIPs per unit thickness compares very favourably to conventional insulation. For instance, standard mineral wool has a thermal conductivity of 0.044 W/(m·K), and rigid polyurethane foam panels about 0.024 W/(m·K). This means that VIPs have about one-fifth the thermal conductivity of conventional insulation, and therefore about five times the thermal resistance (R-value) per unit thickness. Based on a typical k-value of 0.007 W/(m·K), the R-value of a typical 25-millimetre-thick (1 in) VIP would be 3.5 m^{2}·K/W (20 h·ft^{2}·°F/BTU). To provide the same R-value, 154 millimetres (6 in) of rockwool or 84 millimetres (3 in) of rigid polyurethane foam panel would be required.

=== Disadvantages ===
However, thermal resistance per unit price is much less than conventional materials. VIPs are more difficult to manufacture than polyurethane foams or mineral wools, and strict quality control of manufacture of the membranes and sealing joins is important if a panel is to maintain its vacuum over a long period of time. Air will gradually enter the panel, and as the pressure of the panel normalizes with its surrounding air its R-value deteriorates. Conventional insulation does not depend on the evacuation of air for its thermal performance, and is therefore not susceptible to this form of deterioration. However, materials like polyurethane foam are susceptible to water absorption and performance degradation as well.

In addition, VIP products cannot be cut to fit as with conventional insulation, as this would destroy the vacuum, and VIPs in non-standard sizes must be made to order, which also increases the cost. So far this high cost has generally kept VIPs out of traditional housing situations, However, their very low thermal conductivity makes them useful in situations where either strict insulation requirements or space constraints make traditional insulation impractical. VIP performance is also temperature dependent—with increasing temperature, conductive and radiative transfer increase. Furthermore, typical panels cannot operate much above 100 °C (212 °F) due to the adhesive used to seal the thin envelope and membrane also itself may fail at higher temperatures.

== See also ==
- Aerogel
- List of insulation materials
- Vacuum flask
