= Aluminized cloth =

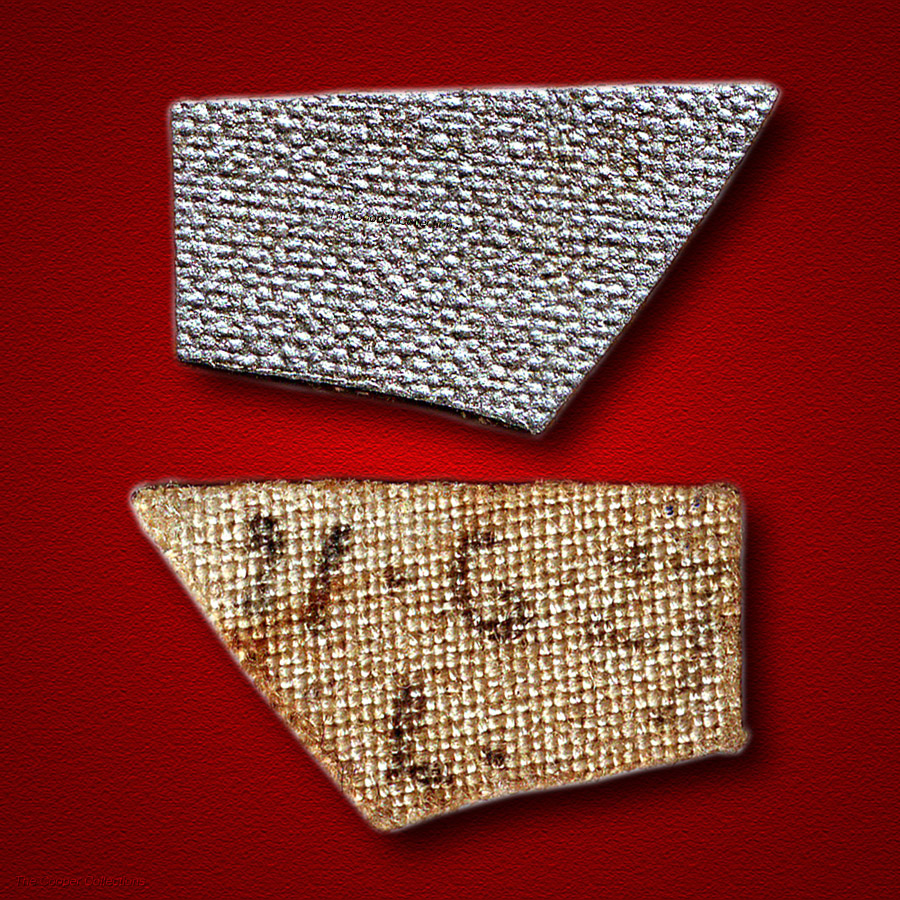
Aluminized skin fabric from the Spirit of St. Louis.

Aluminized cloth is a material designed to reflect thermal radiation. Applications include fire proximity suits, emergency space blankets, protection in molten metal handling, and insulation for building and containers.

Aluminium powder was added to aircraft dope which was then used to give a shiny finish to fabric-covered aircraft, so protecting them from sunlight. The Hindenburg airship was treated in this way and it has been suggested that the aluminium powder made the skin more combustible and so caused or contributed to the Hindenburg disaster. This theory is controversial and experiments have been conducted to test the hypothesis.

== See also ==
- Reflectivity
- Thermal insulation
- MythBusters (2007 season)#Hindenburg Mystery
