= Fluid conductance =

Fluid conductance is a measure of how effectively fluids are transported through a medium or a region. The concept is particularly useful in cases in which the amount of fluid transported is linearly related to whatever is driving the transport.

For example, the concept is useful in the flow of liquids through permeable media, especially in hydrology in relation to river and lake bottoms. In this case, it is an application of intrinsic permeability to a unit of material with a defined area and thickness, and the magnitude of conductance affects the rate of groundwater recharge or interaction with groundwater. This parameter is often used in such computer modelling codes as MODFLOW.

Conductance is also a useful concept in the design and study of vacuum systems. Such systems consist of vacuum chambers and the various flow passages and pumps that connect and maintain them. These systems are common in physical science laboratories and many laboratory apparatus as well, such as mass spectrometers. Typically, the pressures inside these devices are low enough that the gas inside them is rarefied, meaning here that the mean free path of constituent atoms and molecules is a non-negligible fraction of the dimensions of orifices and passageways. Under those conditions, the total mass flow through an orifice or conduit is typically linearly proportional to the pressure drop, so that it is convenient to quantify mass flow in terms of the fluid conductance of the constituent components.

== Example from hydrology ==
For example, the conductance of water through a stream-bed is:

$$C_b = K \frac{A}{b}$$

where

$C_b$ is the conductance of the stream-bed ([L^{2}T^{−1}]; m^{2}s^{−1} or ft^{2}day^{−1})
$K$ is the hydraulic conductivity of the stream-bed materials([LT^{−1}]; m·s^{−1} or ft·day^{−1}];
$A$ is the area of the stream-bed ([L^{2}]; m^{2} or ft^{2})
$b$ is the thickness of the stream-bed sediments ([L]; m or ft)

The volumetric discharge through the stream-bed can be calculated if the difference in hydraulic head is known:

$$Q_b = C_b (h_b - h)\,$$

where

$Q_b$ is the volumetric discharge through the stream-bed ([L^{3}T^{−1}]; m^{3}s^{−1} or ft^{3}day^{−1})
$h_b$ is the hydraulic head of the river (elevation stage)
$h$ is the hydraulic head of the aquifer below the stream-bed ([L]; m or ft)

== Example from vacuum technology ==
The defining equation for conductance in vacuum technology is

$$Q = (P_1-P_2)C.$$

Here

$Q$ is the total throughput, usually by convention not measured as a mass throughput but rather as a pressure throughput and having units of pressure times volume per second,
$P_1$ and $P_2$ are the upstream and downstream pressures,
$C$ is the conductance, having units of volume/time, which are the same units as pumping speed for a vacuum pump.

This definition proves useful in vacuum systems because under conditions of rarefied gas flow, the conductance of various structures is usually constant, and the overall conductance of a complex network of pipes, orifices and other conveyances can be found in direct analogy to a resistive electrical circuit.

For example, the conductance of a simple orifice is

$C = 15 d^2$ liters/sec, where $d$ is measured in centimeters.
