= Rate of heat flow =

Thermodynamic property

The rate of heat flow is the amount of heat that is transferred per unit of time in some material, usually measured in watts (joules per second). Heat is the flow of thermal energy driven by thermal non-equilibrium, so the term 'heat flow' is a redundancy (i.e. a pleonasm). Heat must not be confused with stored thermal energy, and moving a hot object from one place to another must not be called heat transfer. However, it is common to say ‘heat flow’ to mean ‘heat content’.

The formula for the rate of heat flow is:

$$\frac{Q}{\Delta t} =  -kA \frac{\Delta T}{\Delta x}$$

where

- $Q$ is the net heat (energy) transfer,
- $\Delta t$ is the time taken,
- $\Delta T$ is the difference in temperature between the cold and hot sides,
- $\Delta x$ is the thickness of the material conducting heat (distance between hot and cold sides),
- $k$ is the thermal conductivity of the material conducting heat, and
- $A$ is the surface area of the surface emitting heat.

If a piece of material whose cross-sectional area is $A$ and thickness is $\Delta x$ with a temperature difference $\Delta T$ between its faces is observed, heat flows between the two faces in a direction perpendicular to the faces. The time rate of heat flow, $\frac{Q}{\Delta t}$, for small $Q$ and small $\Delta t$, is proportional to $A\times\frac{\Delta T}{\Delta x}$. In the limit of infinitesimal thickness $\Delta x$, with temperature difference $\Delta T$, this becomes $H = -kA(\frac{\Delta T}{\Delta x})$, where $H =( \frac{Q}{\Delta t})$ is the time rate of heat flow through the area $A$, $\frac{\Delta T}{\Delta x}$ is the temperature gradient across the material, and $k$, the proportionality constant, is the thermal conductivity of the material. People often use $k$, $\lambda$, or the Greek letter $\kappa$ to represent this constant. The minus sign is there because the rate of heat flow is always negative—heat flows from the side at higher temperature to the one at lower temperature, not the other way around.

== See also ==
- Heat transfer coefficient
- Heat transfer
- Thermal conduction
- Thermal conductivity
- Heat flux
- Watt
- Flux
