= Polyisocyanurate =

Type of plastic typically used for thermal insulation

The generalised chemical structure of polyisocyanurate showing the isocyanurate group. The polyols are abbreviated as R-groups.

Polyisocyanurate (/ˌpɒlɪˌaɪsoʊsaɪˈænjʊəreɪt/), also referred to as PIR, polyol, or ISO, is a thermoset plastic typically produced as a foam and used as rigid thermal insulation. The starting materials are similar to those used in polyurethane (PUR) except that the proportion of methylene diphenyl diisocyanate (MDI) is higher and a polyester-derived polyol is used in the reaction instead of a polyether polyol. The resulting chemical structure is significantly different, with the isocyanate groups on the MDI trimerising to form isocyanurate groups which the polyols link together, giving a complex polymeric structure.

== Manufacturing ==
The reaction of (MDI) and polyol takes place at higher temperatures compared with the reaction temperature for the manufacture of PUR. At these elevated temperatures and in the presence of specific catalysts, MDI will first react with itself, producing a stiff, ring molecule, which is a reactive intermediate (a tri-isocyanate isocyanurate compound). Remaining MDI and the tri-isocyanate react with polyol to form a complex poly(urethane-isocyanurate) polymer (hence the use of the abbreviation PUI as an alternative to PIR), which is foamed in the presence of a suitable blowing agent. This isocyanurate polymer has a relatively strong molecular structure, because of the combination of strong chemical bonds, the ring structure of isocyanurate and high cross link density, each contributing to the greater stiffness than found in comparable polyurethanes. The greater bond strength also means these are more difficult to break, and as a result a PIR foam is chemically and thermally more stable: breakdown of isocyanurate bonds is reported to start above 200 °C, compared with urethane at 100 to 110 °C.

PIR typically has an MDI/polyol ratio, also called its index (based on isocyanate/polyol stoichiometry to produce urethane alone), higher than 180. By comparison PUR indices are normally around 100. As the index increases material stiffness the brittleness also increases, although the correlation is not linear. Depending on the product application greater stiffness, chemical and/or thermal stability may be desirable. As such PIR manufacturers can offer multiple products with identical densities but different indices in an attempt to achieve optimal end use performance.

== Uses ==
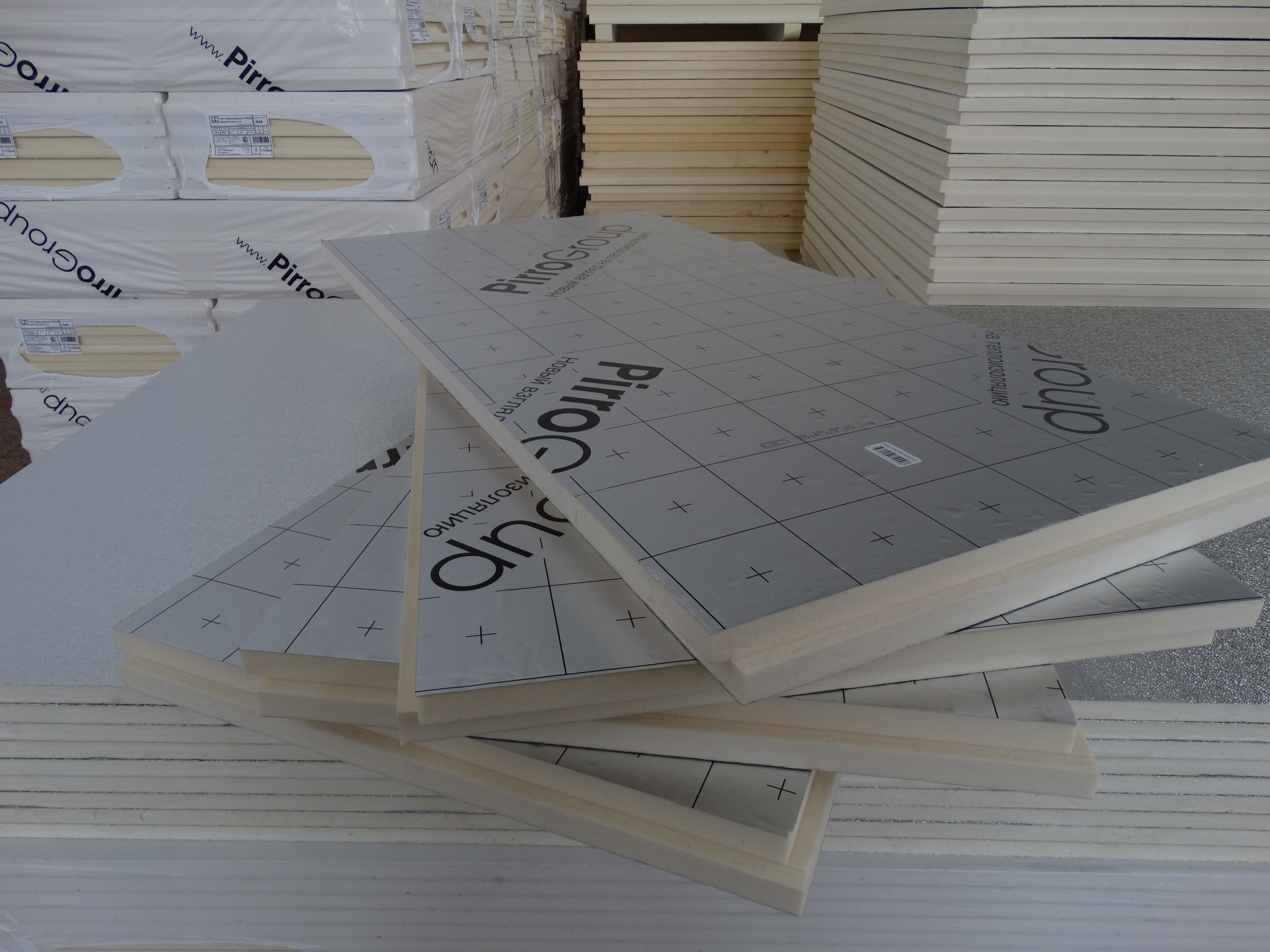
Polyisocyanurate insulation boards

PIR is typically produced as a foam and used as rigid thermal insulation. Its thermal conductivity has a typical value of 0.023 W/(m·K) (0.16 BTU·in/(hr·ft^{2}·°F)) depending on the perimeter:area ratio. PIR foam panels laminated with pure embossed aluminium foil are used for fabrication of pre-insulated duct that is used for heating, ventilation and air conditioning systems. Prefabricated PIR sandwich panels are manufactured with corrosion-protected, corrugated steel facings bonded to a core of PIR foam and used extensively as roofing insulation and vertical walls (e.g. for warehousing, factories, office buildings etc.). Other typical uses for PIR foams include industrial and commercial pipe insulation, and carving/machining media (competing with expanded polystyrene and rigid polyurethane foams).

Effectiveness of the insulation of a building envelope can be compromised by gaps resulting from shrinkage of individual panels. Manufacturing criteria require that shrinkage be limited to less than 1% (previously 2%). Even when shrinkage is limited to substantially less than this limit, the resulting gaps around the perimeter of each panel can reduce insulation effectiveness, especially if the panels are assumed to provide a vapor/infiltration barrier. Multiple layers with staggered joints, ship lapped or tongue & groove joints greatly reduce these problems.

Polyisocyanurates of isophorone diisocyanate are also used in the preparation of polyurethane coatings based on acrylic polyols and polyether polyols.

== Health hazards ==
PIR insulation can be a mechanical irritant to skin, eyes, and upper respiratory system during fabrication (such as dust). No statistically significant increased risks of respiratory diseases have been found in studies.

=== Fire risk ===
PIR board fire test

PIR is at times stated to be fire retardant, or contain fire retardants, but these describe the results of "small scale tests" and "do not reflect [all] hazards under real fire conditions"; the extent of hazards from fire include not just resistance to fire but the scope for toxic byproducts from different fire scenarios.

A 2011 study of fire toxicity of insulating materials at the University of Central Lancashire's Centre for Fire and Hazard Science studied PIR and other commonly used materials under more realistic and wide-ranging conditions representative of a wider range of fire hazard, observing that most fire deaths resulted from toxic product inhalation. The study evaluated the degree to which toxic products were released, looking at toxicity, time-release profiles, and lethality of doses released, in a range of flaming, non-flaming, and poorly ventilated fires, and concluded that PIR generally released a considerably higher level of toxic products than the other insulating materials studied (PIR > PUR > EPS > PHF; glass and stone wools also studied). In particular, hydrogen cyanide is recognised as a significant contributor to the fire toxicity of PIR (and PUR) foams.

PIR insulation board (cited as the FR4000 and the FR5000 products of Celotex, a Saint-Gobain company) was proposed to be used externally in the refurbishment of Grenfell Tower, London, with vertical and horizontal runs of 100 mm and 150 mm thickness respectively; subsequently "Ipswich firm Celotex confirmed it provided insulation materials for the refurbishment." On 14 June 2017 the block of flats, within 15 minutes, was enveloped in flames from the fourth floor to the top 24th floor. The public inquiry into the fire determined that the Celotex Insulation material was a contributory factor to the causes of the rapid spread of the fire.
