= Wool insulation =

Building insulation material

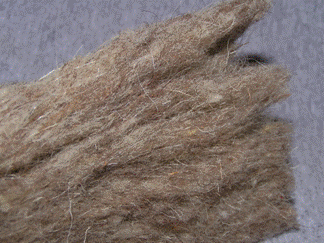
A sample sheep wool insulation batt

Wool insulation is made from sheep wool fibres that are either mechanically held together or bonded using between 5% and 20% recycled polyester adhesive to form insulating batts, rolls and ropes. Some companies do not use any adhesives or bonding agents, but rather entangle the wool fibers into in high R-Value, air capturing knops (or balls) that hold themselves together. Natural wool insulation is effective for both thermal and acoustic insulation. The wool is often sourced from the less expensive black wools of the UK and Europe. Batts are commonly used in the walls and ceilings of timber-frame buildings, rolls can be cut to size for lofts, and ropes can be used between the logs in log homes. Wool knops are installed loosely in attics or in walls as a blow-in-blanket system utilizing a fiber mesh to hold the wool in place during the blow in process.

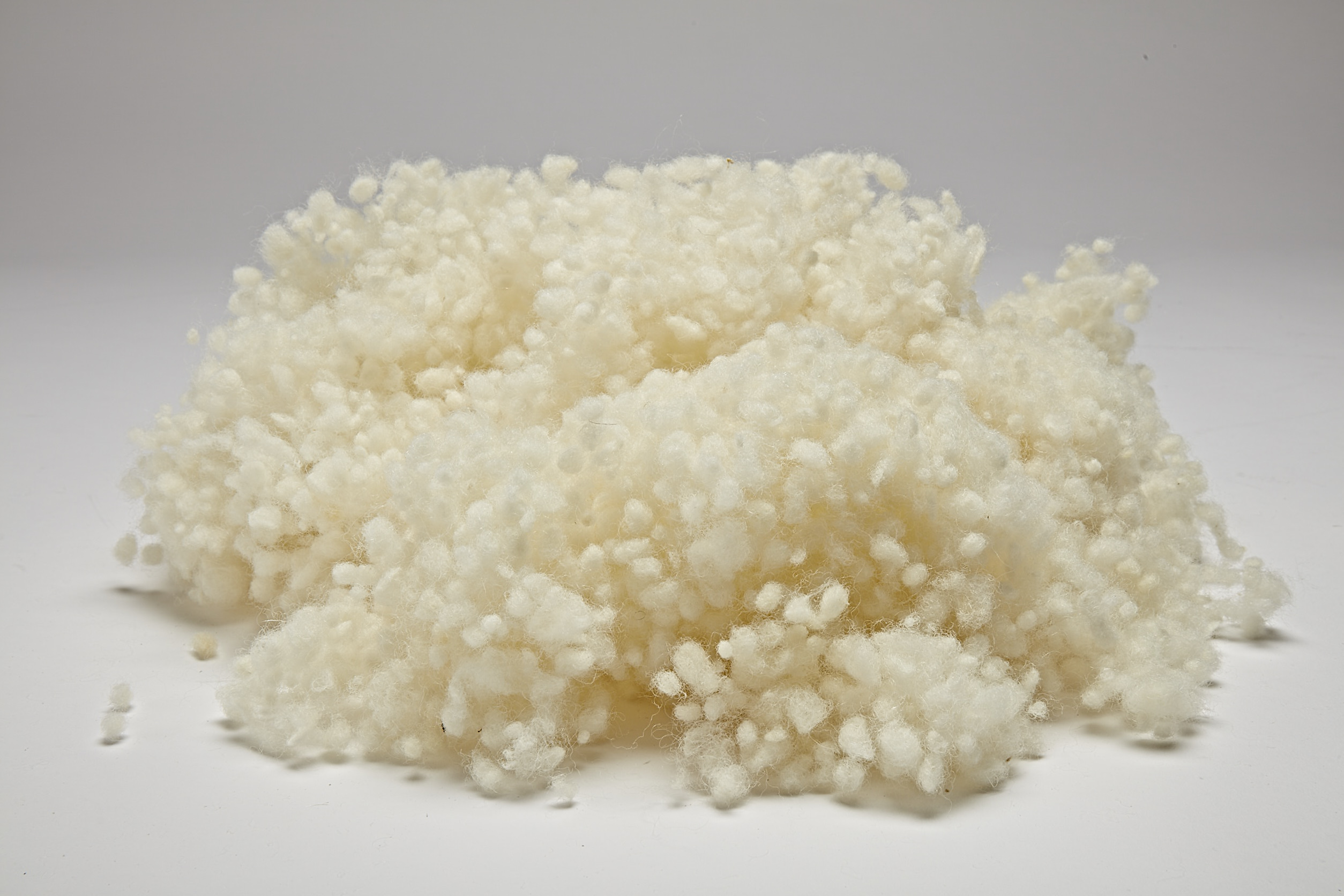
Wool.Life Wool Knops

Natural wool insulation should be distinguished from mineral wool insulation, also called slag wool or rock wool, which only resembles natural wool fibers. It is actually made from rock, blast furnace slag, and other raw materials which are melted and spun into fibers.

Sheep wool is a natural, sustainable, recyclable material, which is biodegradable, and has low embodied energy. It does not endanger the health of people or the environment, and does not require protection to install, unlike fiberglass insulation. Wool is a highly effective insulating material which performs better than its rated R value because it can absorb and release moisture.

Mongolian nomads used felted and woven sheep wool pads as an insulating layer on the walls and floors of their dwellings, called ger or yurts. The use of wool for insulation is starting to rise in popularity. It is already popular in Australia, which produces 55% of the world's raw and processed wool, as well as in Europe and Canada, and is gaining ground in the United States

== Building considerations ==
Wool insulation commonly comes in rolls of batts or ropes with varied widths and thicknesses depending on the manufacturer. Generally, wool batts have thicknesses of 50 mm (2 in) to 100mm (4 in), with widths of 400 mm (16 in) and 600 mm (24 in), and lengths of 4000 mm (13 ft 4 in), 5000 mm (16 ft 8 in), 6000 mm (20 ft) and 7200 mm (24 ft). The widths of 16 in and 24 in are the standard measurements between studs in a stud frame wall. Most manufacturers provide custom sizes as well and batts and ropes are easy to cut once on site.

Wool insulation costs significantly more than conventional fiberglass insulation, but does not require the use of protective gloves, and may have significantly lower health risks to both the building occupants and the installation crew. It can be used in the roof, walls and floors of any building type as long as there are spaces to put the insulation in. Installing wool insulation is very similar to installing conventional insulation batts; it can be held into place with staples or it can be friction-fit, which involves cutting the insulation slightly bigger than the space it occupies, using friction to hold it in place.

A drawback of wool insulation is that it can become infested with moths.

== Environmental considerations ==
Some wool used to manufacture insulation is the wool discarded as waste by other industries due to its colour or grade. As a controlled waste product it cannot be disposed of until it is cleaned. Hence the energy footprint of washing the wool is attributed to the livestock industry under PAS2050. There are some primary environmental factors that need to be considered when looking for a source of wool, such as the way the flock is treated for pesticides, the chemicals used in the treatment of the wool after shearing, and the distance from the source to its final destination. Sheep are often treated with insecticide and fungicide in a process called dipping. This leaves a residue on the fleece and can result in groundwater contamination if used improperly. These residues are often washed off once the fleece is sheared, but this results in three byproducts: grease, liquor, and sludge. The first two can be safely disposed of, but the third contains remnants of the pesticides which cause a concern for disposal.

Sheep wool insulation is often treated with borax to enhance its fire retardant and pest repellent qualities. The level of Borax is relatively low only 4% dry weight although the scouring baths have a higher load of 8–9%. Borax mining employs one of the cleanest mining techniques available but borax is increasingly coming into focus as a suspected reproductive toxin having been considered relatively safe for many years; animal ingestion studies in several species, at high doses, indicate that borates cause reproductive and developmental effects. The most significant exposure route for humans is inhalation which raises questions over whether dust from wool insulation could lead to a significant exposure to humans, though this is probably unlikely for anyone except professional installers.

There are some companies that use DE (Diatomaceous Earth) as pesticide. DE is believed to be harmless and is used in feed and animals to stave off parasites. DE has the drawback of having to be applied in two steps to be effective and the wool having to be installed loose.

Some companies use Thorlan IW (Kaliumfluorotitanat), which repels moths. It is a titanium based treatment which remains with the fiber during its entire period of use. Thorlan IW is in the European Union chemical law register of certified products. A rubber solution is applied hot and allows a coating of Thorlan to stay with the product for its lifetime.
