= Slayter Center of Performing Arts =

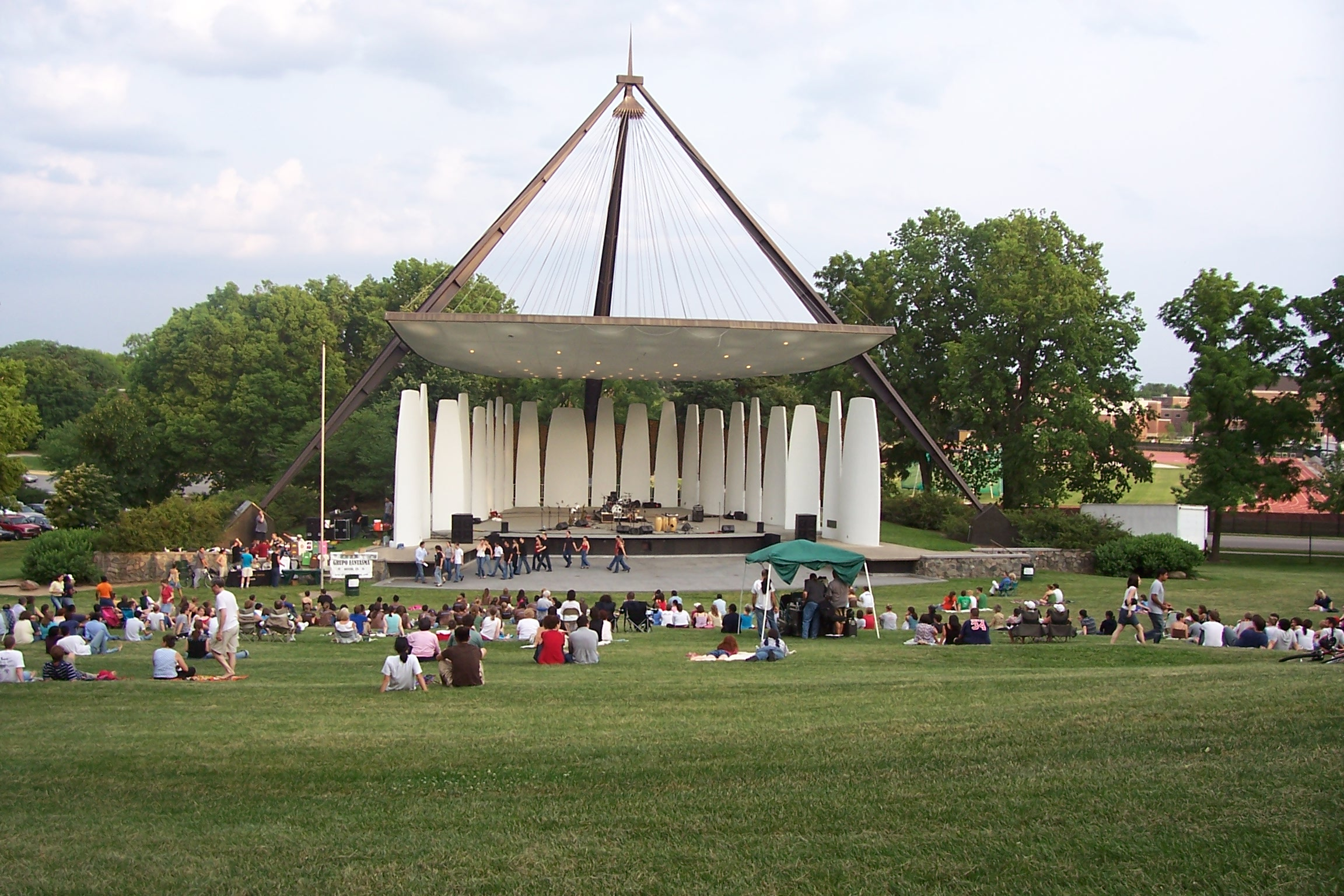
- Slayter Center of Performing Arts - June 2006
- Interactive map of Slayter Center of Performing Arts
- Address: W Stadium Ave; West Lafayette, IN; United States
- Coordinates: 40.431879°N 86.922574°W
- Seating type: Grass
- Capacity: 20,000
- Type: Outdoor amphitheater
- Events: Music, concerts
- Field size: (Stage) 56 feet (17 m) front, 34 feet (10 m) back x 46 feet (14 m) deep
- Field shape: Flaring horn

Construction
- Opened: 1964
- Architect: Joseph Baker

The Slayter Center of Performing Arts is located on the main campus of Purdue University in West Lafayette, Indiana, United States. It is an outdoor concert bandshell completed in 1964 and dedicated May 1, 1965. The facility was a gift from Games Slayter and his wife Marie.

== Features ==
The natural amphitheater created by Slayter Hill can hold 20,000 people. Architect Joseph Baker used Stonehenge in England as a basis for the concept of the Slayter Center. The 200-ton concrete roof is suspended by stainless steel cables from a tall steel tripod and the stage can seat an orchestra of more than a hundred. Below the stage are a rehearsal room, dressing rooms and storage facilities. Slayter Center is home to the Purdue Jazz Bands.

Before 2013, on the morning of home football games, Slayter Center became the site of a pep rally known as "Thrill on the Hill." The Purdue All-American Marching Band performed upbeat tunes showcasing music from their halftime show for the day, plus other selections from the season's repertoire. Fans could meet and get autographs from the Purdue Cheerleaders and mascot Purdue Pete, or check out the Boilermaker Special before heading to Ross–Ade Stadium with the band for the pre-game.

Since the 2013–2014 season, the All-American Marching Band has performed their "211 Session," or pre-game pep rally, at nearby Mackey Arena, with Slayter Center now being the performance site for a post-game concert.

Starting in 2017, All-American has returned to Slayter Center for "Thrill on the Hill," with the post-game concert taking place on the field at Ross-Ade Stadium.

During the school year, movies are projected onto a large, inflatable screen in front of the amphitheater. It is also home to several free concerts throughout the year. In winter, students often sled on Slayter Hill.

== See also ==
- List of contemporary amphitheatres
- List of music venues in the United States
