= Games Slayter =

American engineer and inventor

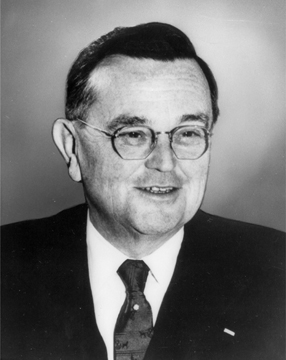
Games Slayter

Games Slayter (9 December 1896 – 15 October 1964) was a prolific U.S. engineer and inventor. He is best known for developing fiberglass, starting with a new method of producing glass wool in 1933.

== Biography ==
Slayter was born in Argos, Indiana as Russell Games Slayter. He dropped Russell early in his life. He graduated from Argos High School in 1914, and from Western Military Academy (Alton, Illinois) in 1915. At age 20 he married Maude Marie Foor (1917). He graduated from Purdue University in 1921 with a Bachelor of Science degree in chemical engineering. While at Purdue, Slayter marched tuba in the Purdue All-American Marching Band.

Slayter was a registered professional engineer in the state of Ohio.

== Career ==
Slayter joined Owens-Illinois Glass Co. (Toledo, Ohio) in 1931, and began working on a commercial process for producing glass fibers. He first applied for a patent for a new process to make glass wool in 1933. In 1938 he was named vice-president, research and development, of the newly formed Owens-Corning Fiberglas™ Corporation. He held that position until his retirement in December 1963.

Slayter served on the Materials Advisory Board of the United States National Research Council, and consulted on industrial applications for NASA. He was also a member of the Board of Distinguished Consultants for the Ohio Society of Professional Engineers and the Advisory Counsel of the Patent, Trade Mark, and Copyright Foundation.

Slayter served as Director of Park National Bank. He was a trustee of Denison University from 1959 until his death.

== Honors and awards ==
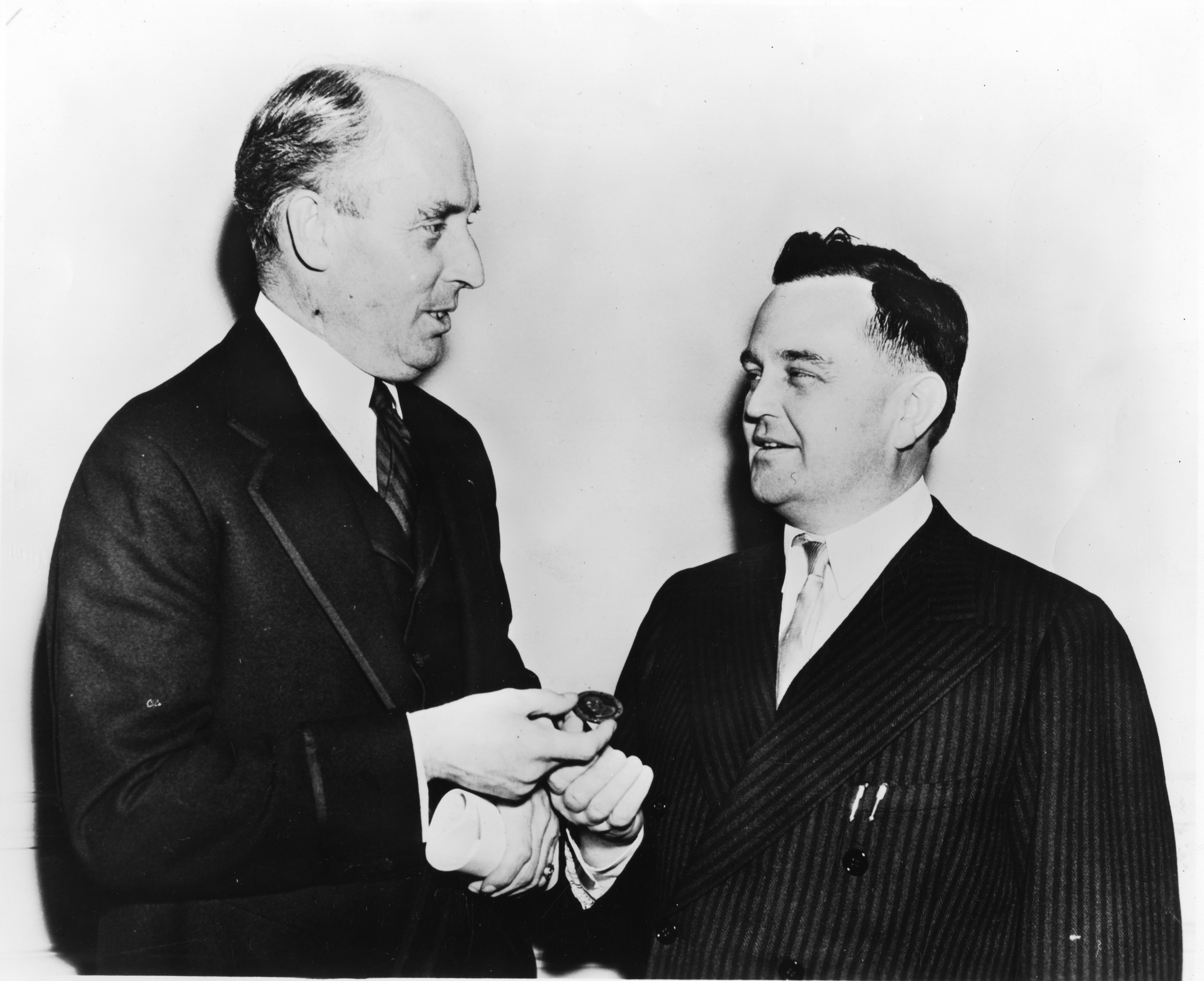
Slayter (right) accepts the Franklin Award for his development of fiberglass (May 15, 1940).

On 29 September 1961, the Granville Technical Center (renamed Science and Technology Center in 1992) was dedicated to Games Slayter, to honor his more than 30 years of contributions to the glass fiber industry.

Slayter was a Fellow or Member of:

- Society of Glass Technology (England)
- American Association for the Advancement of Science
- American Institute of Chemists, the American Ceramics Society
- American Chemical Society
- American Institute of Chemical Engineers
- American Institute of Physics
- Franklin Institute
- Professional Engineers Society

He received the Quarter Century Citation award from the National Academy of Sciences. He received the Modern Pioneer Award from the National Association of Manufacturers (1940). He received the Longstreth Medal of Franklin Institute. He was decorated with the Industrial Research Institute (IRI) Medal (1948). He received the Ohio Award of the American Institute of Chemistry (1953).

Slayter was given an honorary doctorate in engineering from Purdue University (1949). He received an honorary Doctor of Science from Ohio State University (1963).

Slayter received a posthumous induction into the National Inventors Hall of Fame (2006).

== Philanthropy ==
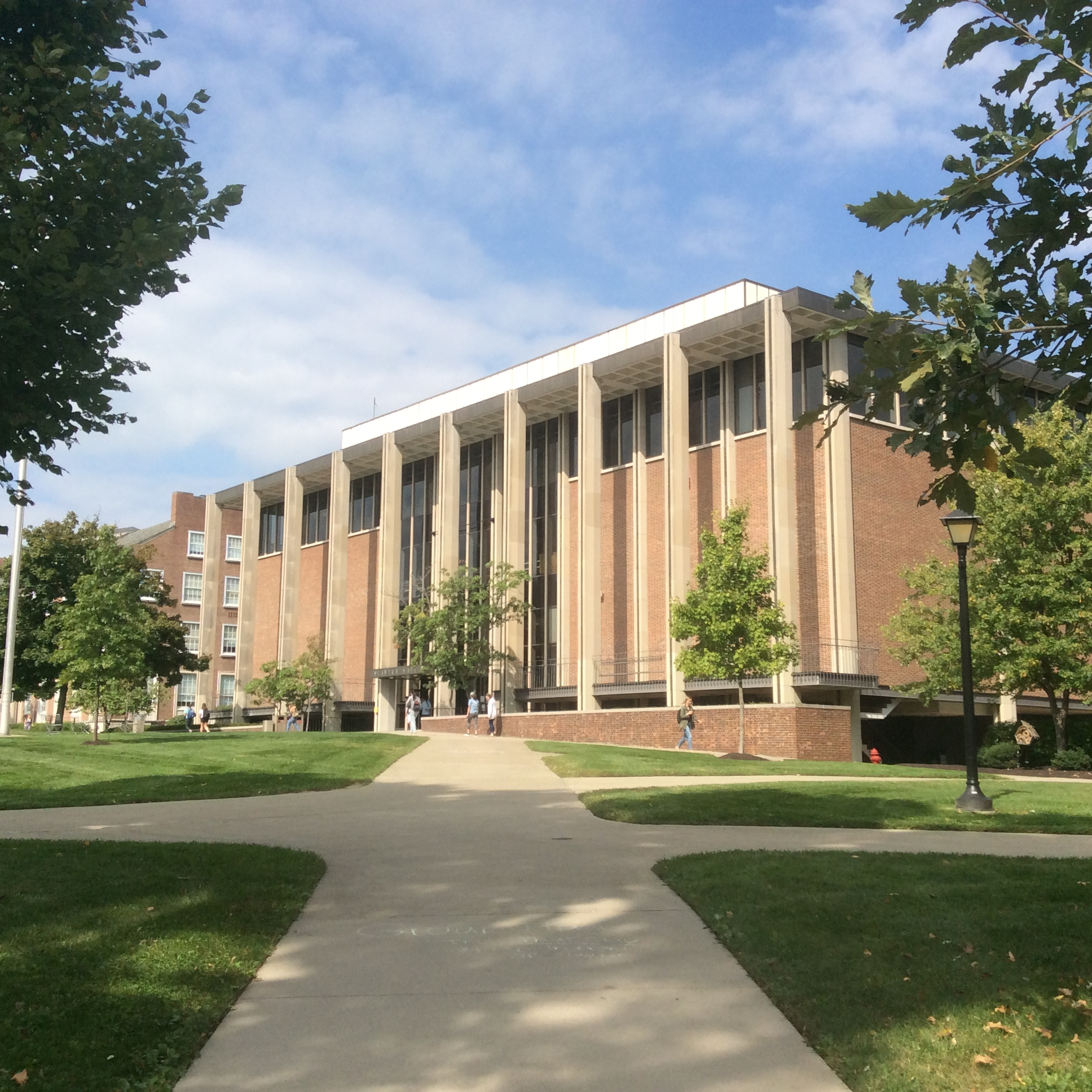
Slayter Union, Denison University

- Slayter was a founding member of the Licking County Foundation Governing Committee.
- In 1961 the student union at Denison University was named Slayter Union in recognition of his $1 million gift.
- Slayter contributed to Newark, Ohio educational television station WGSF.
- He led a fundraising campaign for a new YMCA building in Newark, Ohio.
- Games and Marie Slayter donated $300,000 for the Slayter Center of Performing Arts at Purdue (1963).

== Inventions and patents ==
- US Patent Number 2133235: Method & Apparatus for Making Glass Wool
- US Patent Number 2230272: Method of Producing Glass Fibers
- US Patent Number 2175225: Method of Making Glass Wool
- US Patent Number RE21863: Method & Apparatus of Melting & Fining Glass
- US Patent Number 2305500: Apparatus for Electrically Generating Pressures
- US Patent Number 2109258: Sealing Apparatus
- US Patent Number 2311613: Transparent Composite Materials
- US Patent Number 2333213: Static Eliminator
