= Pipe insulation =

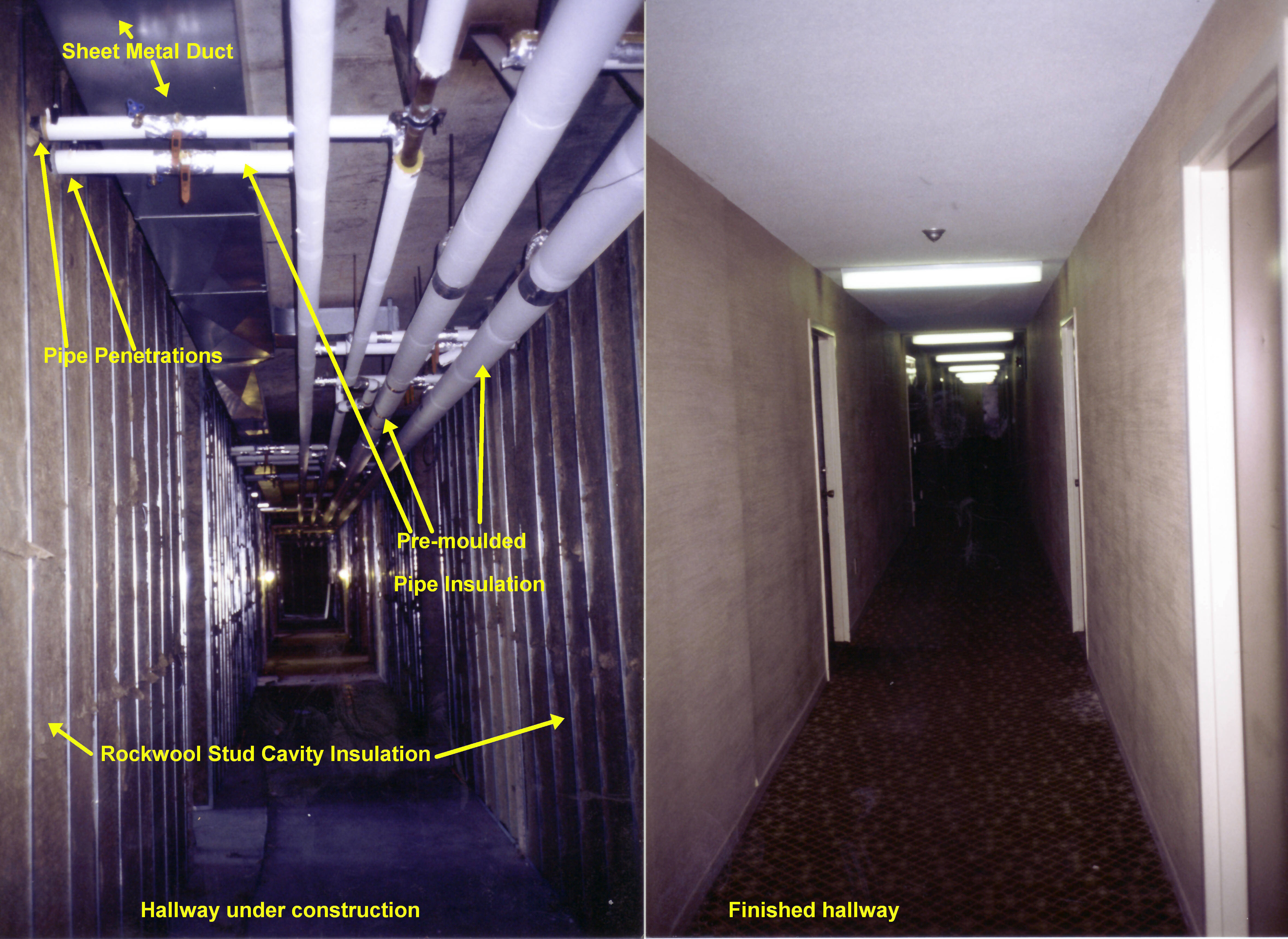
Pipe insulation and building insulation shown together during construction and once finished in an apartment building in Ontario, Canada.

Pipe Insulation is thermal or acoustic insulation used on pipework.

== Applications ==
=== Condensation control ===
Where pipes operate at below-ambient temperatures, the potential exists for water vapor to condense on the pipe surface. Moisture is known to contribute to many different types of corrosion, so preventing the formation of condensation on pipework is usually considered important.

Pipe insulation can prevent condensation forming, as the surface temperature of the insulation will vary from the surface temperature of the pipe. Condensation will not occur, provided that (a) the insulation surface is above the dewpoint temperature of the air; and (b) the insulation incorporates some form of water-vapour barrier or retarder that prevents water vapour from passing through the insulation to form on the pipe surface.

=== Pipe freezing ===
Since some water pipes are located either outside or in unheated areas where the ambient temperature may occasionally drop below the freezing point of water, any water in the pipework may potentially freeze. When water freezes it expands and this expansion can cause failure of a pipe system in any one of a number of ways.

Pipe insulation cannot prevent the freezing of standing water in pipework, but it can increase the time required for freezing to occur—thereby reducing the risk of the water in the pipes freezing. For this reason, it is recommended to insulate pipework at risk of freezing, and local water-supply regulations may require pipe insulation be applied to pipework to reduce the risk of pipe freezing.

For a given length, a smaller-bore pipe holds a smaller volume of water than a larger-bore pipe, and therefore water in a smaller-bore pipe will freeze more easily (and more quickly) than water in a larger-bore pipe (presuming equivalent environments). Since smaller-bore pipes present a greater risk of freezing, insulation is typically used in combination with alternative methods of freeze prevention (e.g., modulating trace heating cable, or ensuring a consistent flow of water through the pipe).

=== Energy saving ===
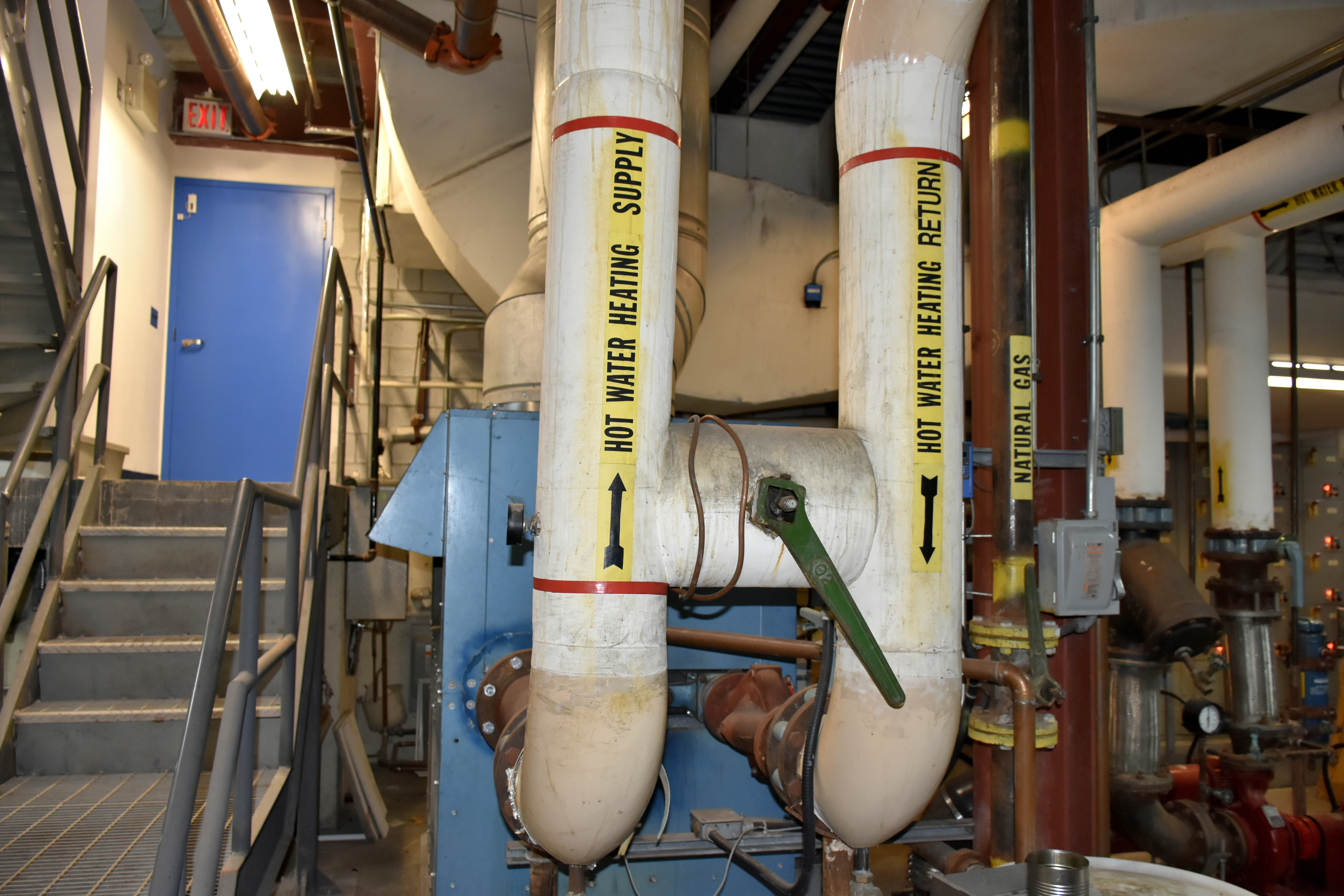
Insulated hot water supply and return hydronic piping on a gas-fired boiler

Since pipework can operate at temperatures far removed from the ambient temperature, and the rate of heat flow from a pipe is related to the temperature differential between the pipe and the surrounding ambient air, heat flow from pipework can be considerable. In many situations, this heat flow is undesirable. The application of thermal pipe insulation introduces thermal resistance and reduces the heat flow.

Thicknesses of thermal pipe insulation used for saving energy vary, but as a general rule, pipes operating at more-extreme temperatures exhibit a greater heat flow and larger thicknesses are applied due to the greater potential savings.

The location of pipework also influences the selection of insulation thickness. For instance, in some circumstances, heating pipework within a well-insulated building might not require insulation, as the heat that's "lost" (i.e., the heat that flows from the pipe to the surrounding air) may be considered “useful” for heating the building, as such "lost" heat would be effectively trapped by the structural insulation anyway. Conversely, such pipework may be insulated to prevent overheating or unnecessary cooling in the rooms through which it passes.

=== Protection against extreme temperatures ===
Where pipework is operating at extremely high or low temperatures, the potential exists for injury to occur should any person come into physical contact with the pipe surface. The threshold for human pain varies, but several international standards set recommended touch temperature limits.

Since the surface temperature of insulation varies from the temperature of the pipe surface, typically such that the insulation surface has a "less extreme" temperature, pipe insulation can be used to bring surface touch temperatures into a safe range.

=== Control of noise ===
Pipework can operate as a conduit for noise to travel from one part of a building to another (a typical example of this can be seen with waste-water pipework routed within a building). Acoustic insulation can prevent this noise transfer by acting to damp the pipe wall and performing an acoustic decoupling function wherever the pipe passes through a fixed wall or floor and wherever the pipe is mechanically fixed.

Pipework can also radiate mechanical noise. In such circumstances, the breakout of noise from the pipe wall can be achieved by acoustic insulation incorporating a high-density sound barrier.

== Factors influencing performance ==
The relative performance of different pipe insulation on any given application can be influenced by many factors. The principal factors are:

- Thermal conductivity ("k" or "λ" value)
- Surface emissivity ("ε" value)
- Water-vapour resistance ("μ" value)
- Insulation thickness
- Density

Other factors, such as the level of moisture content and the opening of joints, can influence the overall performance of pipe insulation. Many of these factors are listed in the international standard EN ISO 23993.

== Materials ==
Pipe insulation materials come in a large variety of forms, but most materials fall into one of the following categories.

=== Mineral wool ===
Mineral wools, including rock and slag wools, are inorganic strands of mineral fibre bonded together using organic binders. Mineral wools are capable of operating at high temperatures and exhibit good fire performance ratings when tested.

Mineral wools are used on all types of pipework, particularly industrial pipework operating at higher temperatures.

=== Glass wool ===
Glass wool is a high-temperature fibrous insulation material, similar to mineral wool, where inorganic strands of glass fibre are bound together using a binder.

As with other forms of mineral wool, glass-wool insulation can be used for thermal and acoustic applications.

=== Flexible elastomeric foams ===
These are flexible, closed-cell, rubber foams based on NBR or EPDM rubber. Flexible elastomeric foams exhibit such a high resistance to the passage of water vapour that they do not generally require additional water-vapour barriers. Such high vapour resistance, combined with the high surface emissivity of rubber, allows flexible elastomeric foams to prevent surface condensation formation with comparatively small thicknesses.

As a result, flexible elastomeric foams are widely used on refrigeration and air-conditioning pipework. Flexible elastomeric foams are also used on heating and hot-water systems.

=== Rigid foam ===
Pipe insulation made from rigid Phenolic, PIR, or PUR foam insulation is common in some countries. Rigid-foam insulation has minimal acoustic performance but can exhibit low thermal-conductivity values of 0.021 W/(m·K) or lower, allowing energy-saving legislation to be met whilst using reduced insulation thicknesses.

=== Polyethylene ===
Polyethylene is a flexible plastic foamed insulation that is widely used to prevent freezing of domestic water supply pipes and to reduce heat loss from domestic heating pipes.

The fire performance of Polyethylene is typically 25/50 E84 compliant up to 1" thickness.

=== Cellular Glass ===
100% Glass manufactured primarily from sand, limestone & soda ash. Cellular insulations are composed of small individual cells either interconnecting or sealed from each other to form a cellular structure. Glass, plastics, and rubber may comprise the base material and a variety of foaming agents are used. Cellular insulations are often further classified as either open cell (cells are interconnecting) or closed cell (cells sealed from each other). Generally, materials that have greater than 90% closed cell content are considered to be closed cell materials.

=== Aerogel ===
Silica Aerogel insulation has the lowest thermal conductivity of any commercially produced insulation. Although no manufacturer currently manufactures Aerogel pipe sections, it is possible to wrap Aerogel blanket around pipework, allowing it to function as pipe insulation.

The usage of Aerogel for pipe insulation is currently limited.

== Heat flow calculations and R-value ==
Heat flow passing through pipe insulation can be calculated by following the equations set out in either the ASTM C 680 or EN ISO 12241 standards. Heat flux is given by the following equation:

$$q = \frac{ \Theta_i - \Theta_a }{ R_T }$$

Where:

- $\Theta_i$ is the internal pipe temperature,
- $\Theta_a$ is the external ambient temperature, and
- $R_T$ is the sum total thermal resistance of all insulation layers and the internal- and external-surface heat-transfer resistances.

In order to calculate heat flow, it is first necessary to calculate the thermal resistance ("R-value") for each layer of insulation.

For pipe insulation, the R-value varies not only with the insulation thickness and thermal conductivity ("k-value") but also with the pipe outer diameter and the average material temperature. For this reason, it is more common to use the thermal conductivity value when comparing the effectiveness of pipe insulation, and R-values of pipe insulation are not covered by the US FTC R-value rule.

The thermal resistance of each insulation layer is calculated using the following equation:

$$R=\frac{D_x \ln(D_e / D_i)}{\lambda}$$

Where:

- $D_e$ represents the insulation outer diameter,
- $D_i$ represents the insulation inner diameter,
- $\lambda$ represents the thermal conductivity ("k-value") at the average insulation temperature (for accurate results iterative calculations are necessary), and
- $D_x$ is either $D_e$ if heat loss calculation will use $D_e$ for area calculation or $D_i$ if it will use $D_i$.

Calculating the heat transfer resistance of the inner- and outer-insulation surfaces is more complex and requires the calculation of the internal- and external-surface coefficients of heat transfer. Equations for calculating this are based on empirical results and vary from standard to standard (both ASTM C 680 and EN ISO 12241 contain equations for estimating surface coefficients of heat transfer).

A number of organisations such as the North American Insulation Manufacturers Association and Firo Insulation offer free programs that allow the calculation of heat flow through pipe insulation.
