= Glass wool =

Insulating material made from fibers of glass

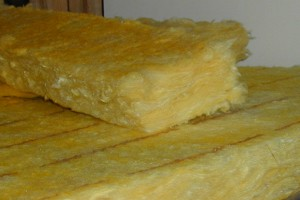
A batt of glass wool insulation

Glass wool is an insulating material made from glass fiber arranged using a binder into a texture similar to wool. The process traps many small pockets of air between the glass, and these small air pockets result in high thermal insulation properties. Glass wool is produced in rolls or slabs, with different thermal and mechanical properties. It may also be produced as a material that can be sprayed or applied in place, on the surface to be insulated. The modern method for producing glass wool was invented by Games Slayter while he was working at the Owens-Illinois Glass Co. in Toledo, Ohio. He first applied for a patent for a new process to make glass wool in 1933.

== Principles of function ==
Gases possess poor thermal conduction properties compared to liquids and solids and thus make good insulation material if they can be trapped in materials so that much of the heat that flows through the material is forced to flow through the gas. To further augment the effectiveness of a gas (such as air) it may be disrupted into small cells which cannot effectively transfer heat by natural convection. Natural convection involves a larger bulk flow of gas driven by buoyancy and temperature differences, and it does not work well in small gas cells where there is little density difference to drive it, and the high surface area to volume ratios of the small cells retards bulk gas flow inside them using viscous drag.

To accomplish the formation of small gas cells in man-made thermal insulation, glass and polymer materials can be used to trap air in a foam-like structure. The same principle used in glass wool is used in other man-made insulators such as rock wool, Styrofoam, wet suit neoprene foam fabrics, and fabrics such as Gore-Tex and polar fleece. The air-trapping property is also the insulation principle used in nature in down feathers and insulating hair such as natural wool.

== Manufacturing process ==
Natural sand and recycled glass are mixed and heated to 1,450 °C (2,640 °F), to produce glass. The fiberglass is usually produced by a method similar to making cotton candy. Molten glass is forced through a rapidly spinning metal cup, called a 'spinner'. The centrifugal force pulls the glass through small holes in the spinner. The newly created fibers cool in contact with the air. Cohesion and mechanical strength are obtained by the presence of a binder that “cements” the fibers together. A drop of binder is placed at each fiber intersection. The fiber mat is then heated to around 200 °C (392 °F) to polymerize the resin and is calendered to give it strength and stability. Finally, the wool mat is cut and packed in rolls or panels, palletized, and stored for use.

== Uses ==
Glass wool is a thermal insulation material consisting of intertwined and flexible glass fibers, which causes it to "package" air, resulting in a low density that can be varied through compression and binder content (as noted above, these air cells are the actual insulator). Glass wool can be a loose-fill material, blown into attics, or together with an active binder, sprayed on the underside of structures, sheets, and panels that can be used to insulate flat surfaces such as cavity wall insulation, ceiling tiles, curtain walls, and ducting. It is also used to insulate piping and for soundproofing.

== Fiberglass batts and blankets ==
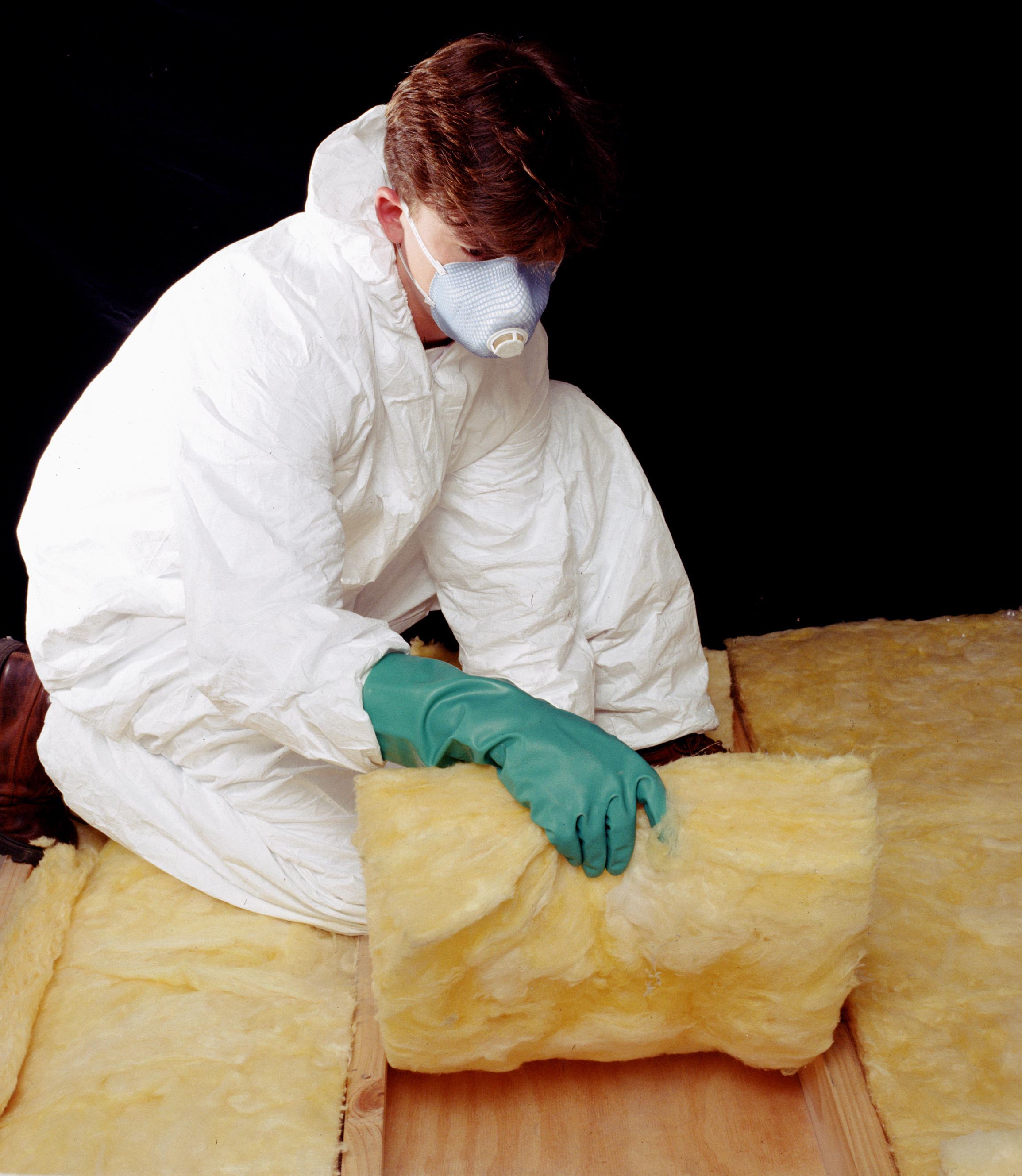
Installing glass wool batts as ceiling insulation

Batts are precut, whereas blankets are available in continuous rolls. Compressing the material reduces its effectiveness. Cutting it to accommodate electrical boxes and other obstructions allows air a free path to cross through the wall cavity. One can install batts in two layers across an unfinished attic floor, perpendicular to each other, for increased effectiveness at preventing heat bridging. Blankets can cover joists and studs as well as the space between them. Batts can be challenging and unpleasant to hang under floors between joists; straps, or staple cloth or wire mesh across joists, can hold it up.

Gaps between batts (bypasses) can become sites of air infiltration or condensation (both of which reduce the effectiveness of the insulation) and require strict attention during the installation. By the same token, careful weatherization and installation of vapour barriers is required to ensure that the batts perform optimally. Air infiltration can be also reduced by adding a layer of cellulose loose-fill on top of the material.

== Health problems ==
Fiberglass will irritate the eyes, skin, and the respiratory system. Potential symptoms include irritation of the eyes, skin, nose, and throat, dyspnea (breathing difficulty), sore throat, hoarseness and cough. Fiberglass used for insulating appliances appears to produce human disease that is similar to asbestosis. Scientific evidence demonstrates that fiberglass is safe to manufacture, install and use when recommended work practices are followed to reduce temporary mechanical irritation. However, these work practices are not always followed, and fiberglass is often left exposed in basements that later become occupied. Fiberglass insulation should never be left exposed in an occupied area, according to the American Lung Association.

In June 2011, the United States National Toxicology Program (NTP) removed from its Report on Carcinogens all bio-soluble glass wool used in home and building insulation and for non-insulation products. Similarly, California's Office of Environmental Health Hazard Assessment ("OEHHA"), in November 2011, published a modification to its Proposition 65 listing to include only "Glass wool fibers (inhalable and biopersistent)." The United States' NTP and California's OEHHA action means that a cancer warning label for biosoluble fiber glass home and building insulation is no longer required under Federal or California law. All fiberglass wools commonly used for thermal and acoustical insulation were reclassified by the International Agency for Research on Cancer (IARC) in October 2001 as Not Classifiable as to carcinogenicity to humans (Group 3).

Fiberglass itself is resistant to mold. If mold is found in or on fiberglass it is more likely that the binder is the source of the mold since binders are often organic and more hygroscopic than glass wool. In tests, glass wool was found to be highly resistant to the growth of mold. Only exceptional circumstances resulted in mold growth: very high relative humidity, 96% and above, or saturated glass wool, although saturated wool glass will only have moderate growth.

== See also ==
- Fiberglass
- Glass fiber
- Mineral wool
