= Green (certification) =

Green rating or certification is used to indicate the level of environmental friendliness for real estate properties.

In the US, it is a real estate designation for Realtors approved by the (American) National Association of Realtors (NAR). The program was developed in 2008 by the Real Estate Buyer's Agent Council of NAR, with administration transferred to the Green Resource Council. The course curriculum includes sustainable building practices, marketing, and rating systems (e.g., LEED, IFGICT and Energy Star). As a result, there is some course content overlap with the EcoBroker and NAGAB's Accredited Green Agent and Broker designations.

In India, the Energy Resources Institute (TERI) developed the GRIHA (Green Rating for Integrated Habitat Assessment). GRIHA is promoted by the Ministry of New and Renewable Energy (MNRE) as a national rating system. It originally developed from LEED and has additional requirements. There is also the Indian green building council (IGBC) rating system.

== See also ==
- Real estate professional designations
- LEED, green building certification program
