= Federal Energy Agency (Russia) =

Russian Energy Agency (Rosenergo) is a federal state budgetary organization under the Ministry of Energy of the Russian Federation, that provides implementation of the Federal Law "Improvement of energy conservation and energy efficiency", and the Government's activities in the field of energy efficiency and sustainable energy development of the Russian economy, innovative energy, renewable energy sources (RES). Furthermore, the Russian Energy Agency is a center for the exchange, monitoring of information, trainings, coordination and promotion of projects in the field of energy efficiency, renewable energy and innovation in the fuel and energy sector. The Russian Energy Agency has an extensive network of branches in 70 regions of the Russian Federation and employs over 2000 people.

The agency was established in December 2009 by converting the FSI "Association" Rosinformresurs "Russian Energy Ministry (Order of the Ministry of Energy of the Russian Federation № 560 of December 16, 2009) in order to implement the major strategic targets for reducing energy intensity of the national economy by 40% by 2020, set by President of Russia Dmitry Medvedev ( Decree № 889 of June 4, 2008 "On some measures to improve energy and environmental performance of the Russian economy").
