= Mineral wool =

Fiber made from spun molten minerals

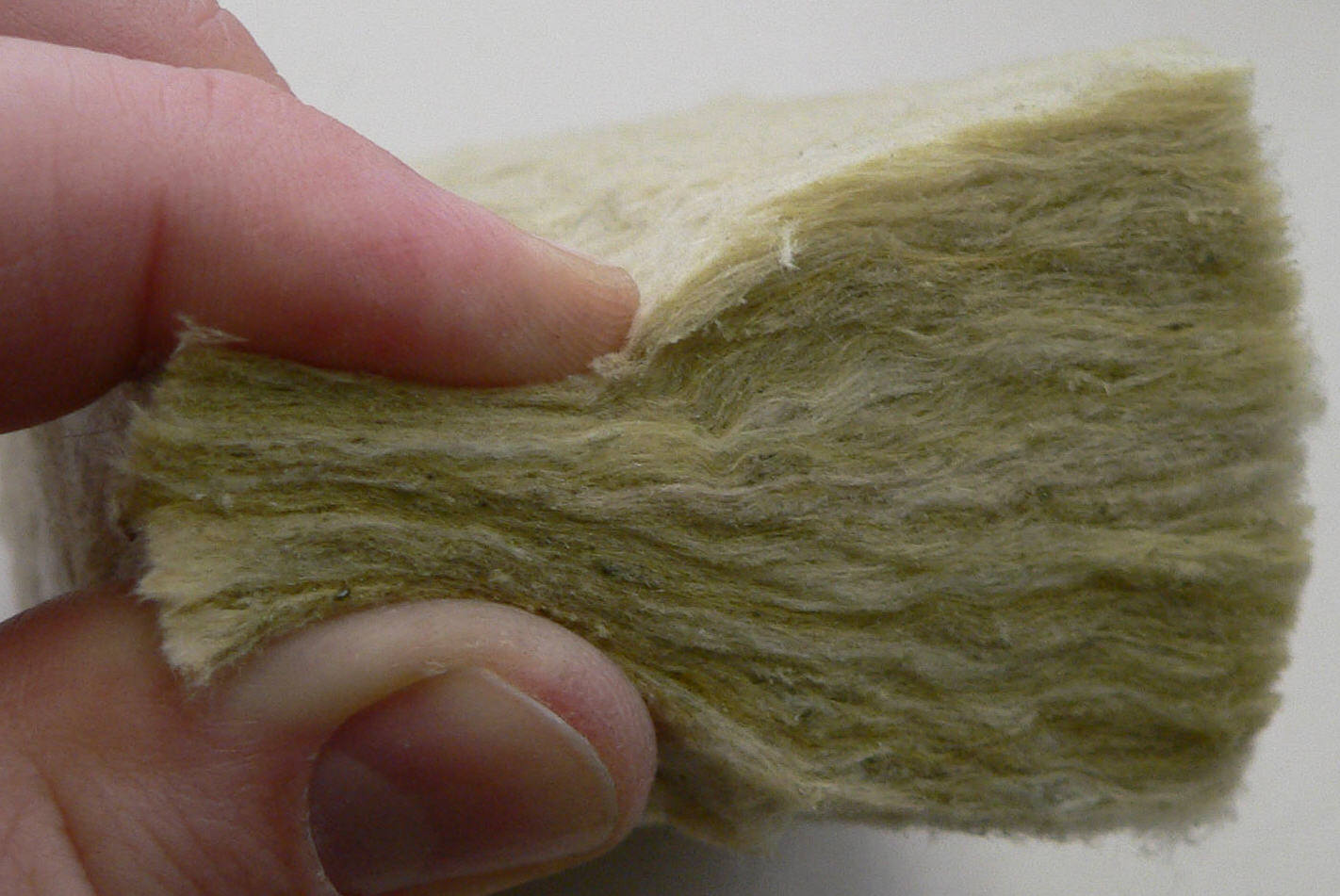
Mineral wool close-up

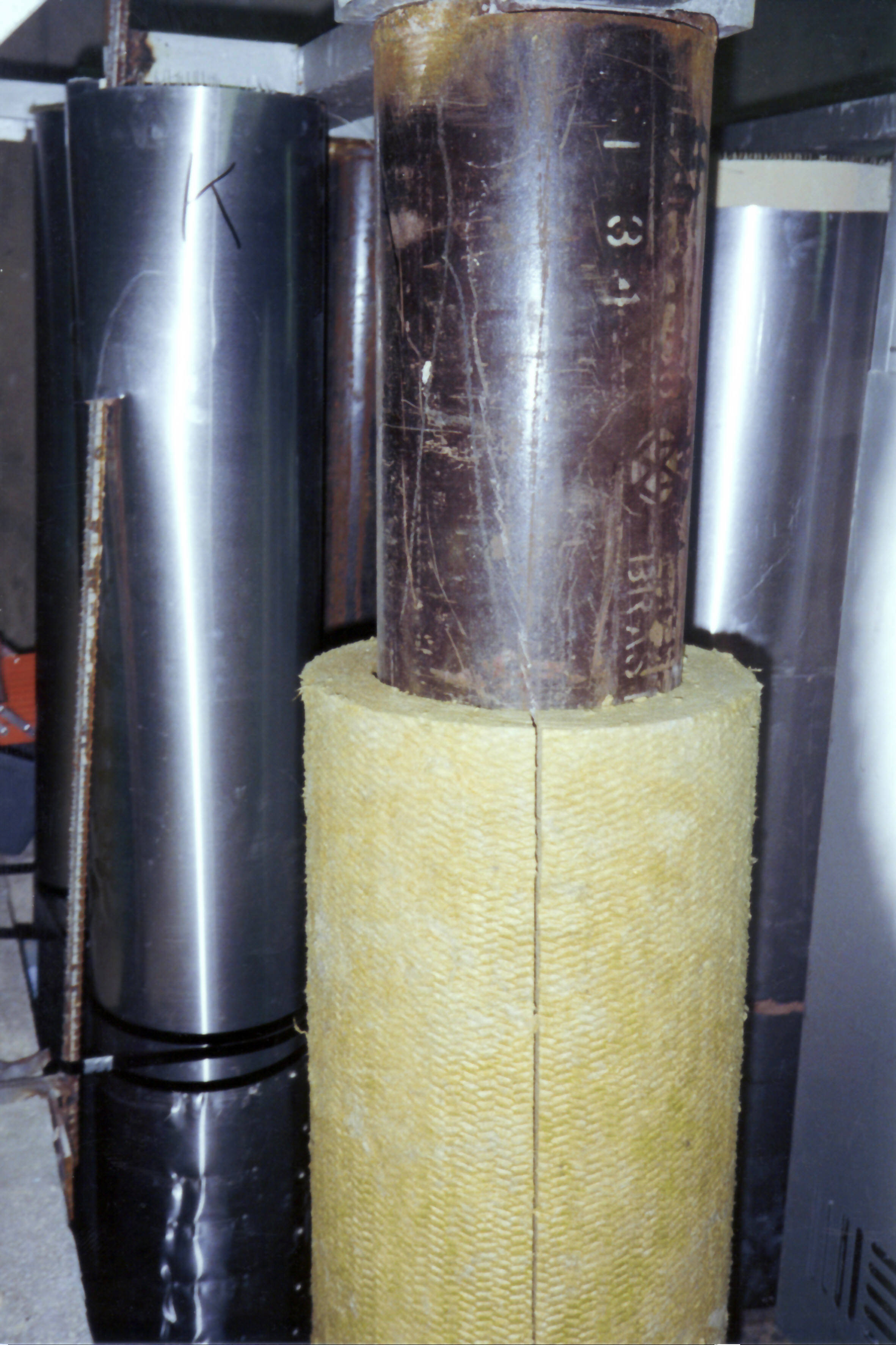
Mineral wool pipe covering applied to a steel pipe for a fire test

Mineral wool (also known as stone wool, mineral cotton, mineral fiber, man-made mineral fiber (MMMF), and man-made vitreous fiber (MMVF)) is any fibrous material formed by spinning or drawing molten mineral or rock materials such as slag and ceramics. It was first manufactured in the 19th century. Applications include thermal insulation (as both structural insulation and pipe insulation), filtration, soundproofing, and hydroponic growth medium. Mineral wool can cause irritation to the eyes, skin and lungs, especially during its manufacture and installation.

== History ==
Slag wool was first made in 1840 in Wales by Edward Parry, "but no effort appears to have been made to confine the wool after production; consequently it floated about the works with the slightest breeze, and became so injurious to the men that the process had to be abandoned". A method of making mineral wool was patented in the United States in 1870 by John Player and first produced commercially in 1871 at Georgsmarienhütte in Osnabrück Germany. The process involved blowing a strong stream of air across a falling flow of liquid iron slag which was similar to the natural occurrence of fine strands of volcanic slag from Kilauea called Pele's hair created by strong winds blowing apart the slag during an eruption.

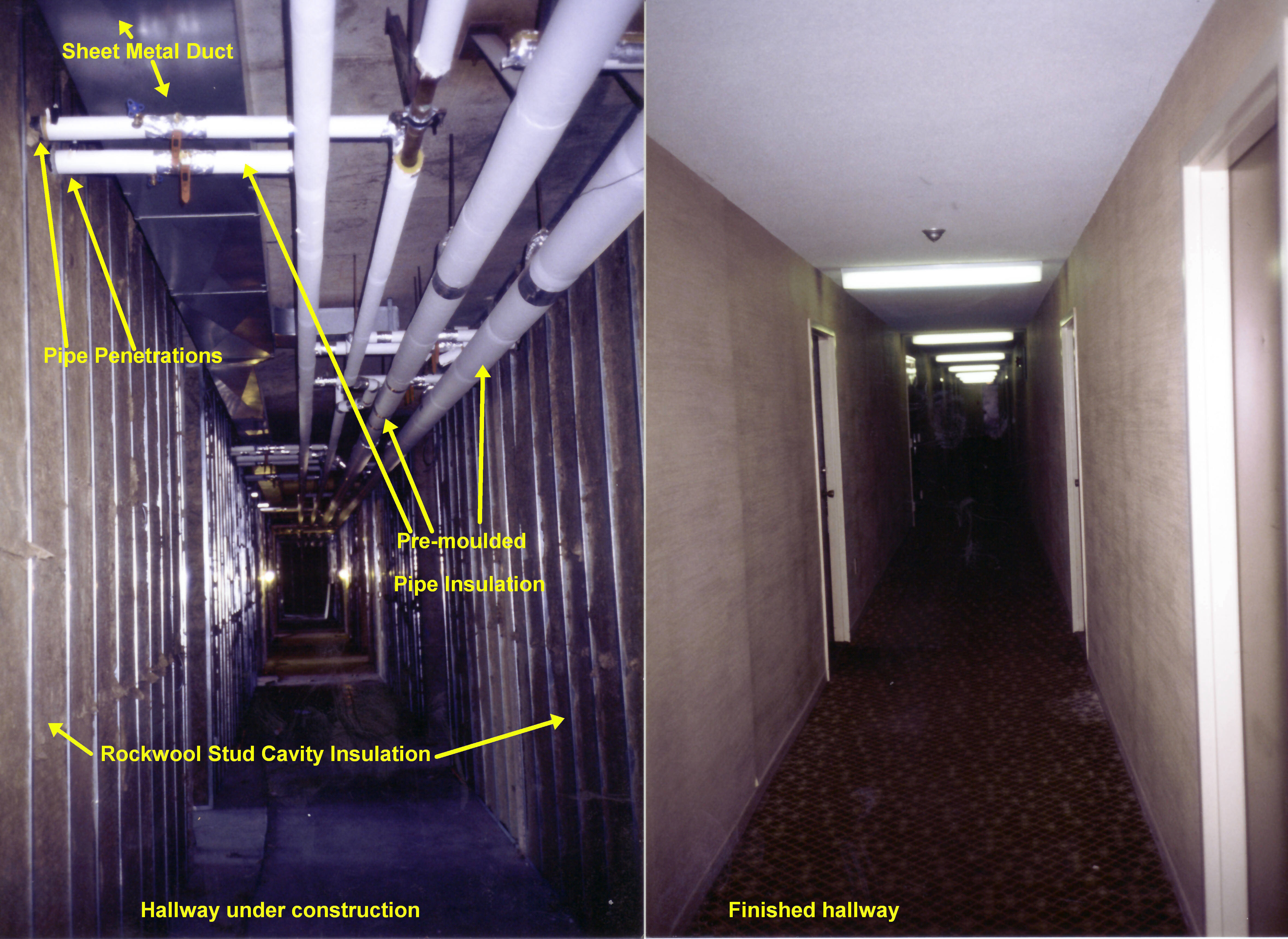
Common insulation applications in an apartment building

In 1936 Spun Rock Wools Limited of Thorold Ontario Canada registered a trademark for Spun Rock Wool, a “Fibrous Insulating Material manufactured from rock and in loose, sheet, or pad form.” Using rock to produce wool insulation material was started in Thorold in 1934. November 1, 1934 according to the registration document UCA8090.

Spun stone wool was made by heating natural dolomite shale to 3,000 °F (1,650 °C) and pouring the white hot liquid onto a whirling disc known as a “spinner.”

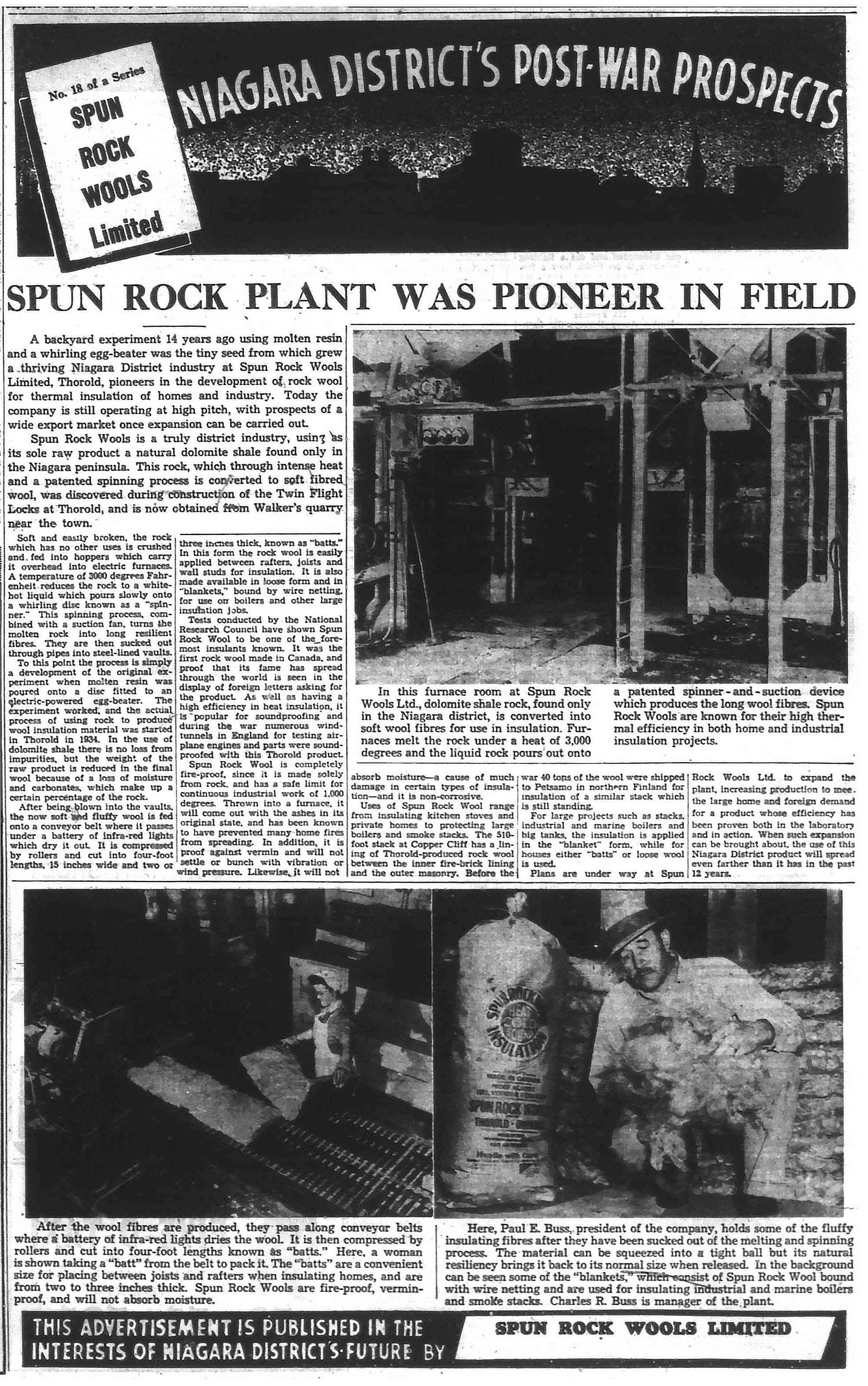
An article from the Niagara Districts Post-War Series published by The Standard in October 1946. The article is focused on Spun Rock Wools Limited in Thorold, Ontario. The plant used stone wool to manufacture thermal insulation.

According to a mineral wool manufacturer, the first mineral wool intended for high-temperature applications was invented in the United States in 1942 but was not commercially viable until approximately 1953. More forms of mineral wool became available in the 1970s and 1980s.

== Properties ==
Classification temperature is the temperature at which a certain amount of linear contraction (usually two to four percent) is not exceeded after a 24-hour heat treatment in an electrically heated laboratory oven in a neutral atmosphere. Depending on the type of product, the value may not exceed two percent for boards and shaped products and four percent for mats and papers. The classification temperature is specified in 50 °C (90 °F) steps starting at 850 °C (1,560 °F) and up to 1,600 °C (2,910 °F). The classification temperature does not mean that the product can be used continuously at this temperature. In the field, the continuous application temperature of amorphous high-temperature mineral wool (AES and ASW) is typically 100 to 150 °C (180 to 270 °F) below the classification temperature. Products made of polycrystalline wool can generally be used up to the classification temperature.

== Types ==
There are several types of high-temperature mineral wool made from different types of minerals. The mineral chosen results in different material properties and classification temperatures.

- Alkaline earth silicate wool (AES wool) consists of amorphous glass fibers that are produced by melting a combination of calcium oxide (CaO−), magnesium oxide (MgO−), and silicon dioxide (SiO_{2}). Products made from AES wool are generally used in equipment that continuously operates and in domestic appliances. Some formulations of AES wool are bio-soluble, meaning they dissolve in bodily fluids within a few weeks and are quickly cleared from the lungs.
- Alumino silicate wool (ASW), also known as refractory ceramic fiber (RCF), consists of amorphous fibers produced by melting a combination of aluminum oxide (Al_{2}O_{3}) and silicon dioxide (SiO_{2}), usually in a weight ratio 50:50 (see also VDI 3469 Parts 1 and 5, as well as TRGS 521). Products made of alumino silicate wool are generally used at application temperatures exceeding 900 °C (1,650 °F) for equipment that operates intermittently and in critical application conditions (see Technical Rules TRGS 619).
- Polycrystalline wool (PCW) consists of fibers that contain aluminum oxide (Al_{2}O_{3}) at greater than 70 percent of the total materials and is produced by sol–gel method from aqueous spinning solutions. The water-soluble green fibers obtained as a precursor are crystallized by means of heat treatment. Polycrystalline wool is generally used at application temperatures exceeding 1,300 °C (2,370 °F) and in critical chemical and physical application conditions.
- Kaowool is a type of high-temperature mineral wool made from the mineral kaolin. It was one of the first types of high-temperature mineral wool invented and has been used into the 21st century. It can withstand temperatures close to 1,650 °C (3,000 °F).

== Manufacture ==
Stone wool is a furnace product of molten rock at a temperature of about 1600°C through which a stream of air or steam is blown. More advanced production techniques are based on spinning molten rock in high-speed spinning heads somewhat like the process used to produce cotton candy. The final product is a mass of fine, intertwined fibers with a typical diameter of 2 to 6 micrometers. Mineral wool may contain a binder, often a terpolymer, and an oil to reduce dusting.

== Applications ==
Though the individual fibers conduct heat very well, when pressed into rolls and sheets, their ability to partition air makes them excellent insulators and sound absorbers. Though not immune to the effects of a sufficiently hot fire, the fire resistance of fiberglass, stone wool, and ceramic fibers makes them common building materials when passive fire protection is required, being used as spray fireproofing, in stud cavities in drywall assemblies and as packing materials in firestops.

Other uses are in resin bonded panels, as filler in compounds for gaskets, in brake pads, in plastics in the automotive industry, as a filtering medium, and as a growth medium in hydroponics.

Mineral fibers are produced in the same way, without binder. The fiber as such is used as a raw material for its reinforcing purposes in various applications, such as friction materials, gaskets, plastics, and coatings.

Heat resistance of mineral wool
Material	Temperature
Glass wool	230–260 °C (446–500 °F)
Stone wool	700–850 °C (1,292–1,562 °F)
Ceramic fiber wool	1,200 °C (2,190 °F)

Mineral wool products can be engineered to hold large quantities of water and air that aid root growth and nutrient uptake in hydroponics; their fibrous nature also provides a good mechanical structure to hold the plant stable. The naturally high pH of mineral wool makes them initially unsuitable to plant growth and requires "conditioning" to produce a wool with an appropriate, stable pH. Conditioning methods include pre-soaking mineral wool in a nutrient solution adjusted to pH 5.5 until it stops bubbling.

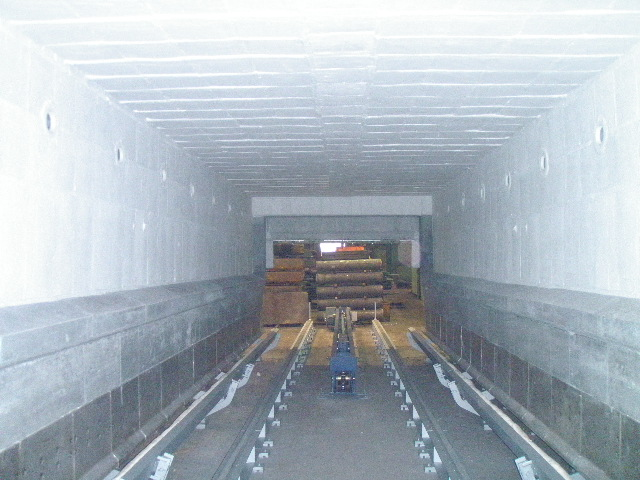
Industrial furnace equipped with high-temperature mineral wool modules

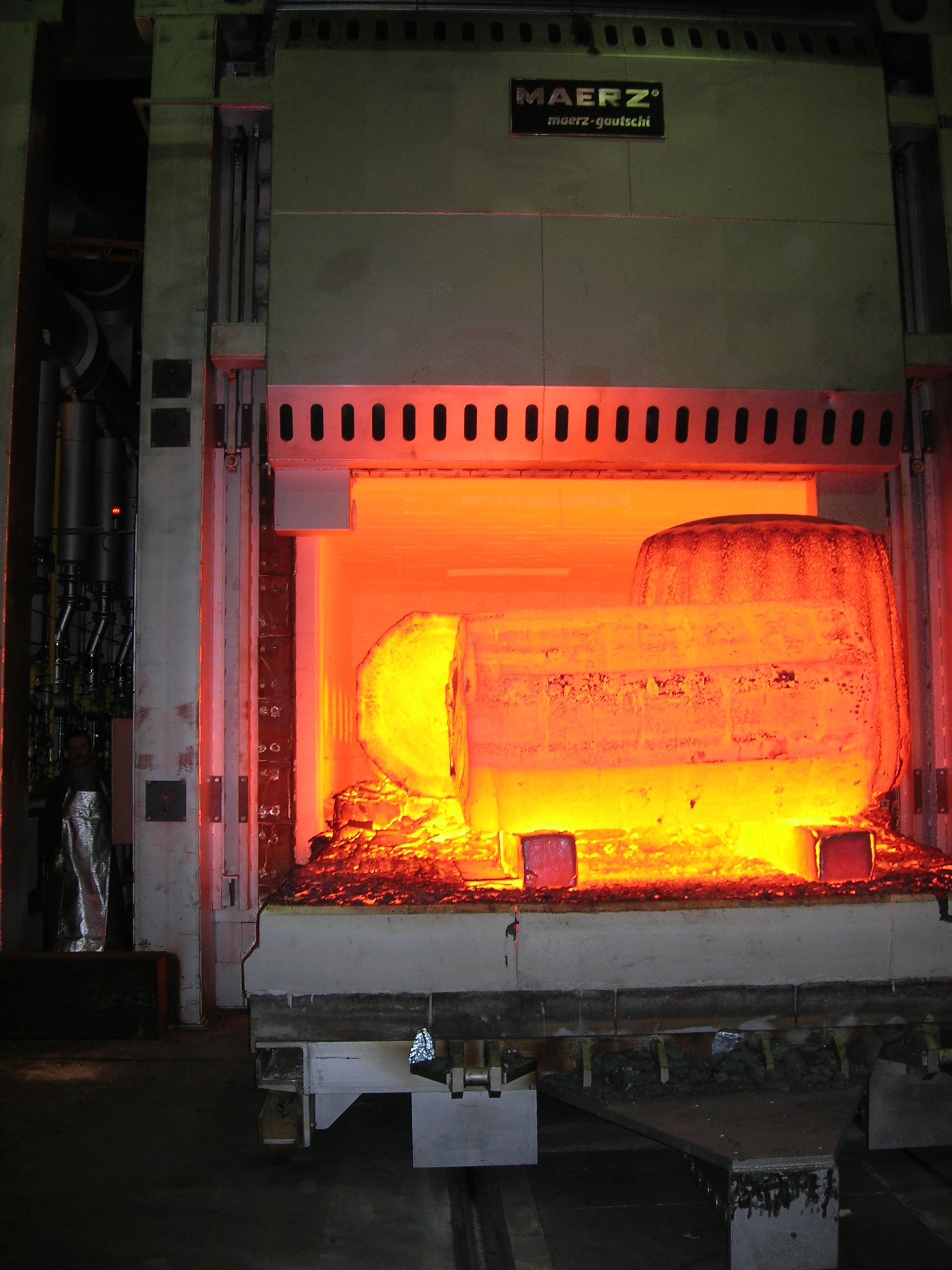
Industrial furnace in operation, equipped with high-temperature mineral wool

High-temperature mineral wool is a type of mineral wool created for use as high-temperature insulation and generally defined as being resistant to temperatures above 1,000 °C (1,830 °F). This type of insulation is usually used in industrial furnaces and foundries. Because high-temperature mineral wool is costly to produce and has limited availability, it is almost exclusively used in high-temperature industrial applications and processes.

High-temperature mineral wool is used primarily for insulation and lining of industrial furnaces and foundries to improve efficiency and safety. It is also used to prevent the spread of fire.

The use of high-temperature mineral wool enables a more lightweight construction of industrial furnaces and other technical equipment as compared to other methods such as fire bricks, due to its high heat resistance capabilities per weight, but has the disadvantage of being more expensive than other methods.

== Safety ==
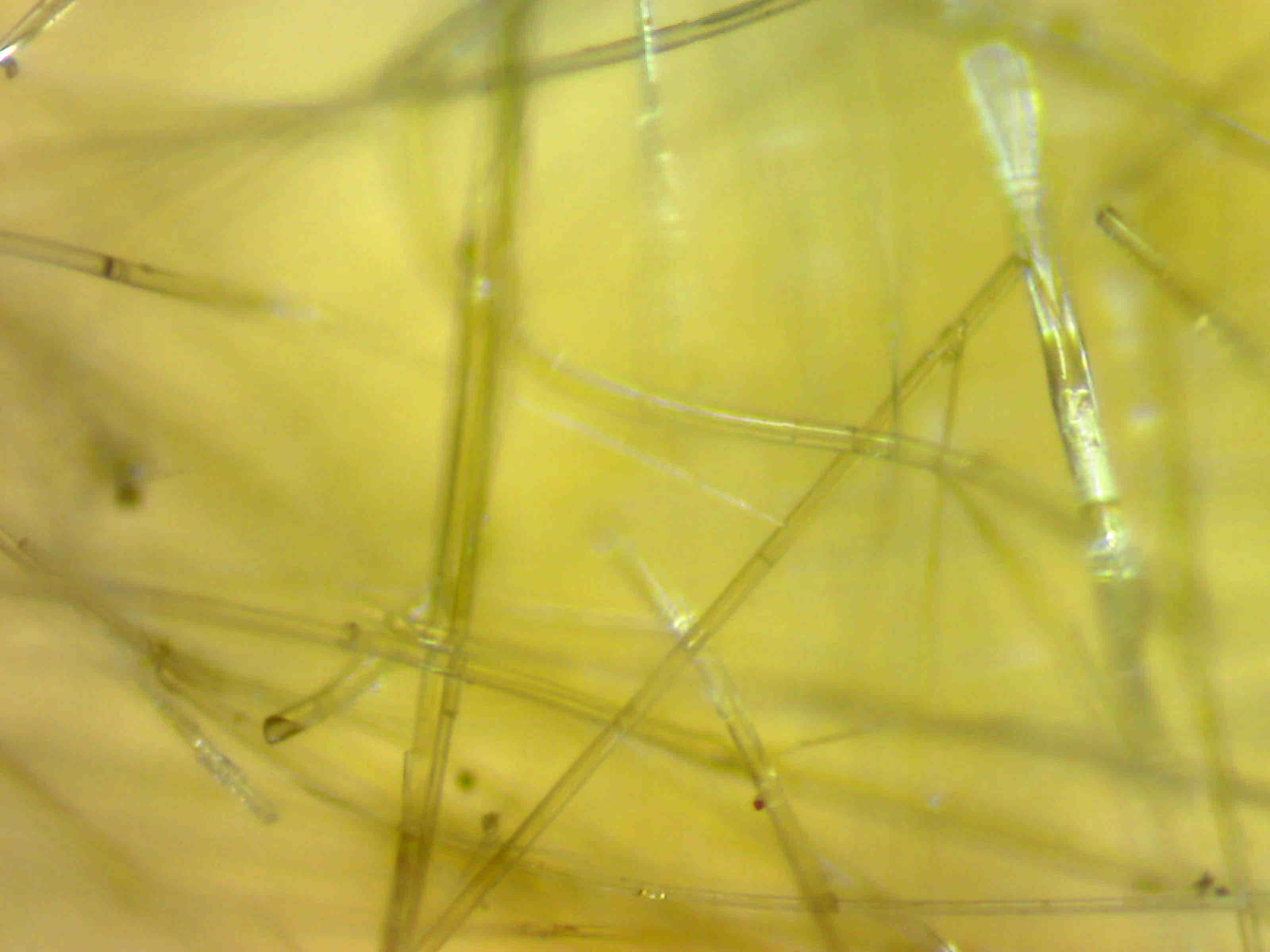
Mineral wool under microscope

The International Agency for Research on Cancer (IARC) reviewed the carcinogenicity of man-made mineral fibers in October 2002. The IARC Monograph's working group concluded only the more biopersistent materials remain classified by IARC as "possibly carcinogenic to humans" (Group 2B). These include refractory ceramic fibers, which are used industrially as insulation in high-temperature environments such as blast furnaces, and certain special-purpose glass wools not used as insulating materials. In contrast, the more commonly used vitreous fiber wools produced since 2000, including insulation glass wool, stone wool, and slag wool, are considered "not classifiable as to carcinogenicity in humans" (Group 3).

High bio soluble fibers are produced that do not cause damage to the human cell. These newer materials have been tested for carcinogenicity and most are found to be noncarcinogenic. IARC elected not to make an overall evaluation of the newly developed fibers designed to be less bio persistent such as the alkaline earth silicate or high-alumina, low-silica wools. This decision was made in part because no human data were available, although such fibers that have been tested appear to have low carcinogenic potential in experimental animals, and because the Working Group had difficulty in categorizing these fibers into functional groups based on chemical composition.

The European Regulation (CE) n° 1272/2008 on classification, labelling and packaging of substances and mixtures updated by the Regulation (CE) n°790/2009 does not classify mineral wool fibers as a dangerous substance if they fulfil criteria defined in its Note Q.

The European Certification Board for mineral wool products, EUCEB, certify mineral wool products made of fibers fulfilling Note Q ensuring that they have a low bio persistence and so that they are quickly removed from the lung. The certification is based on independent experts' advice and regular control of the chemical composition.

Due to the mechanical effect of fibers, mineral wool products may cause temporary skin itching. To diminish this and to avoid unnecessary exposure to mineral wool dust, information on good practices is available on the packaging of mineral wool products with pictograms or sentences. Safe Use Instruction Sheets similar to Safety data sheet are also available from each producer.

People can be exposed to mineral wool fibers in the workplace by breathing them in, skin contact, and eye contact. The Occupational Safety and Health Administration (OSHA) has set the legal limit (permissible exposure limit) for mineral wool fiber exposure in the workplace as 15 mg/m^{3} total exposure and 5 mg/m^{3} respiratory exposure over an 8-hour workday. The National Institute for Occupational Safety and Health (NIOSH) has set a recommended exposure limit (REL) of 5 mg/m^{3} total exposure and 3 fibers per cm^{3} over an 8-hour workday.

Registration, Evaluation, Authorisation and Restriction of Chemicals (REACH) is a European Union regulation of 18 December 2006. REACH addresses the production and use of chemical substances, and their potential impacts on both human health and the environment. A Substance Information Exchange Forum (SIEF) has been set up for several types of mineral wool. AES, ASW and PCW have been registered before the first deadline of 1 December 2010 and can, therefore, be used on the European market.

- ASW/RCF is classified as carcinogen category 1B.
- AES is exempted from carcinogen classification based on short-term in vitro study result.
- PCW wools are not classified; self-classification led to the conclusion that PCW are not hazardous.

On 13 January 2010, some of the aluminosilicate refractory ceramic fibers and zirconia aluminosilicate refractory ceramic fibers have been included in the candidate list of Substances of Very High Concern. In response to concerns raised with the definition and the dossier two additional dossiers were posted on the ECHA website for consultation and resulted in two additional entries on the candidate list. This actual (having four entries for one substance/group of substances) situation is contrary to the REACH procedure intended. Aside from this situation, concerns raised during the two consultation periods remain valid.

Regardless of the concerns raised, the inclusion of a substance in the candidate list triggers immediately the following legal obligations of manufacturers, importers and suppliers of articles containing that substance in a concentration above 0.1% (w/w):

- Notification to ECHA -REACH Regulation Art. 7
- Provision of Safety Data Sheet- REACH Regulation Art. 31.1
- Duty to communicate safe use information or responding to customer requests -REACH Regulation Art. 33

Amorphous high-temperature mineral wool (AES and ASW) is produced from a molten glass stream which is aerosolized by a jet of high-pressure air or by letting the stream impinge onto spinning wheels. The droplets are drawn into fibers; the mass of both fibers and remaining droplets cool very rapidly so that no crystalline phases may form. When amorphous high-temperature mineral wool is installed and used in high-temperature applications such as industrial furnaces, at least one face may be exposed to conditions causing the fibers to partially devitrify. Depending on the chemical composition of the glassy fiber and the time and temperature to which the materials are exposed, different stable crystalline phases may form. In after-use high-temperature mineral wool crystalline silica crystals are embedded in a matrix composed of other crystals and glasses. Experimental results on the biological activity of after-use high-temperature mineral wool have not demonstrated any hazardous activity that could be related to any form of silica they may contain.

== Substitutes ==
Due to the mineral wool non-degradability and potential health risks, substitute materials are being developed: hemp, flax, wool, wood, and cork insulations are the most prominent. Biodegradability and health profile are the main advantages of those materials. Their drawbacks when compared to mineral wool are their substantially lower mold resistance, higher combustibility, and slightly higher thermal conductivity (hemp insulation: 0.040 Wm^{-1}k^{-1}, mineral wool insulation: 0.030-0.045 Wm^{-1}k^{-1}).

== See also ==
- Asbestos
- Basalt fiber
- Glass wool
- Pele's hair
- Risk and Safety Statements
