= Draught excluder =

Insulator to keep cold air from coming under doors and windows

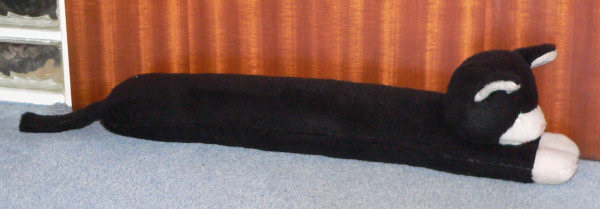
A draught excluder in the shape of a cat

A draught excluder or draft guard is a device used to prevent cold air from entering a building through gaps around entry points such as doors, windows and fireplaces.

== Types ==
=== Door ===
A door draught excluder is placed at the bottom of a door to cover the gap located at the threshold. In the Victorian era these draught excluders would be sausage-shaped and made from fabric stuffed with sawdust.

Tubular sand-filled fabric draught excluders are commonly referred to as "door snakes" in Australia. Jenny Agutter told The Guardian that the hotel in the Outback where they stayed while making Walkabout used them to keep venomous snakes out of the guests' rooms.

=== Window ===
Draught excluders can come in the form of a self-adhesive roll of rubber or other flexible material. The material can be applied over fixed gaps in window frames.

=== Letterbox ===
Letterbox covers usually take the form of a brush-like cover fitted to the inside of the door. Other types include spring-loaded flaps also fitted to the inside.

=== Keyhole ===
Keyholes can be draught proofed with a simple proprietary keyhole cover that is fitted to the inside of the door.

=== Chimneys and fireplaces ===
Unused or infrequently used chimney flues can be draught proofed with balloon- or fabric-type excluders that are fitted in the lower section of the flue. Fireplaces can also be draught proofed using a cover over the opening.
