= Weatherization =

Weatherproofing a building; protecting it from harsh weather

A weatherized building is protected from the outside elements in order to maximize energy efficiency.

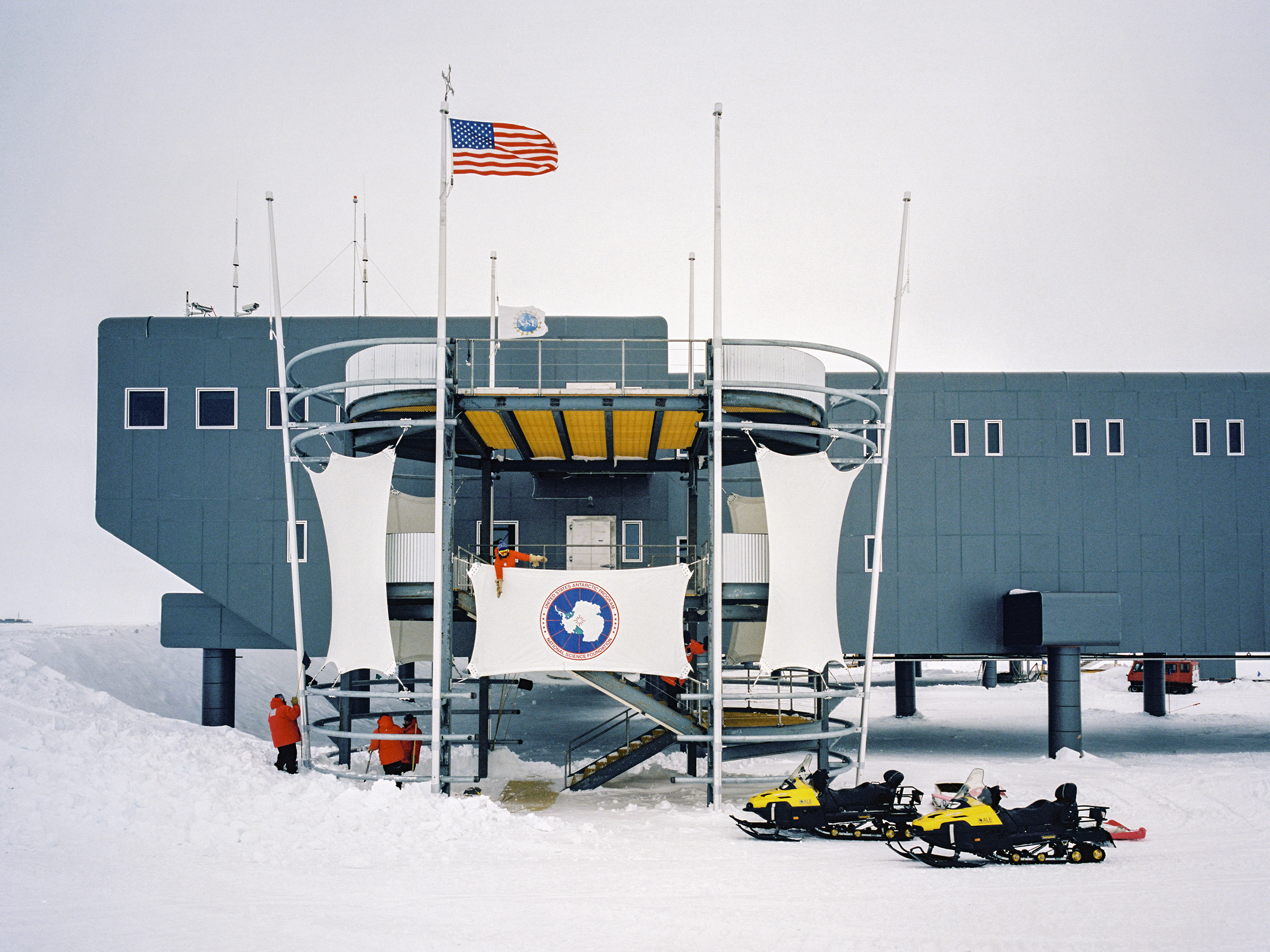
Amundsen–Scott South Pole Station

Weatherization (American English) or weatherproofing (British English) is the practice of protecting a building and its interior from the elements, particularly from sunlight, precipitation, and wind, and of modifying a building to reduce energy consumption and optimize energy efficiency.

Weatherization is distinct from building insulation, although building insulation requires weatherization for proper functioning. Many types of insulation can be thought of as weatherization, because they block drafts or protect from cold winds. Whereas insulation primarily reduces conductive heat flow, weatherization primarily reduces convective heat flow.

In the United States, buildings use one third of all energy consumed and two thirds of all electricity. Due to the high energy usage, they are a major source of the pollution that causes urban air quality problems and pollutants that contribute to climate change. Building energy usage accounts for 49 percent of sulfur dioxide emissions, 25 percent of nitrous oxide emissions, and 10 percent of particulate emissions.

== Procedures ==
Typical weatherization procedures include:

- Sealing bypasses (cracks, gaps, holes), especially around doors, windows, pipes and wiring that penetrate the ceiling and floor, and other areas with high potential for heat loss, using caulk, foam sealant, weather-stripping, window film, door sweeps, electrical receptacle gaskets, and so on to reduce infiltration.
- Sealing recessed lighting fixtures ('can lights' or 'high-hats'), which leak large amounts of air into unconditioned attic space.
- Sealing air ducts, which can account for 20% of heat loss, using fiber-reinforced mastic (not duck/duct tape, which is not suitable for this purpose)
- Installing/replacing dampers in exhaust ducts, to prevent outside air from entering the house when the exhaust fan or clothes dryer is not in use.
- Protecting pipes from corrosion and freezing.
- Installing footing drains, foundation damp proofing/ waterproofing membranes, interior perimeter drains, sump pump, gutters, downspout extensions, downward-sloping grading, French drains, swales, and other techniques to protect a building from both surface water and ground water.
- Providing proper ventilation to unconditioned spaces to protect a building from the effects of condensation. See Ventilation issues in houses
- Installing roofing, building wrap, siding, flashing, skylights or solar tubes and making sure they are in good condition on an existing building.
- Installing insulation in walls, floors, and ceilings, around ducts and pipes, around water heaters, and near the foundation and sill.
- Installing storm doors and storm windows.
- Replacing old drafty doors with tightly sealing, foam-core doors.
- Retrofitting older windows with a stop or parting bead across the sill where it meets the sash.
- Replacing older windows with low-energy, double-glazed windows.

The phrase "whole-house weatherization" extends the traditional definition of weatherization to include installation of modern, energy-saving heating and cooling equipment, or repair of old, inefficient equipment (furnaces, boilers, water heaters, programmable thermostats, air conditioners, and so on). The "Whole-House" approach also looks at how the house performs as a system.

== Air quality ==
Weatherization generally does not cause indoor air quality problems by adding new pollutants to the air. (There are a few exceptions, such as caulking, that can sometimes emit pollutants.) However, measures such as installing storm windows, weather stripping, caulking, and blown-in wall insulation can reduce the amount of outdoor air infiltrating into a home. Consequently, after weatherization, concentrations of indoor air pollutants from sources inside the home can increase.

Weatherization may have a negative impact on indoor air quality, if done improperly, exacerbating respiratory conditions especially among occupants with pre-existing respiratory illnesses. This may occur because of a drastic decrease in air exchange rate in the home, introduction of new chemicals, and poor management of indoor moisture due to a poorly performed weatherization work. Low air exchange rates may lead to higher concentrations of pollutants in the air when ventilation is not sufficiently addressed during weatherization work. However, the situation may be different in case of a house situated in an area with high outdoor air pollution levels such as in close proximity (<200 m) from a busy major road. In such a scenario, a more airtight building envelope can actually offer protection against infiltration of outdoor air pollution. The same is true for the protection offered by tighter building envelopes during wildfire events that cause elevated levels of outdoor air pollution.

== US Weatherization Assistance Program ==
Weatherization is a set of measures and practices aimed at improving the energy efficiency of a building or home, primarily to reduce energy consumption and lower utility bills. The main goal of weatherization is to make a structure more comfortable and cost-effective to live in, especially during extreme weather conditions. It involves making various improvements to a building's insulation, air sealing, and overall energy systems.

The American Council for an Energy-Efficient Economy estimates that up to February 2018 over 7 million homes have been weatherized, giving yearly savings of 2.6 TWh of electricity, 7.9 TWh (27×10^{12} Btu) of fossil gas and 3.2 million metric tons (3.5 million short tons) of reduced carbon dioxide emissions. The US Department of Energy estimates weatherization returns $2.69 for each dollar spent on the program, realized in energy and non-energy benefits. Families whose homes are weatherized are expected to save $358 on their first year's utility bills.

Low Income Home Energy Assistance Programs in many states work side by side with WAP to provide both immediate and long-term solutions to energy poverty.

== See also ==
- Building envelope
- Building indoor environment
- Building performance
- Central heating
- Heating, ventilation and air conditioning (HVAC)
- Low-energy house
- Vapor barrier
- WikiBooks How-to guide to Weatherization
