= Building at 417–419 Lee Street =

- U.S. National Register of Historic Places
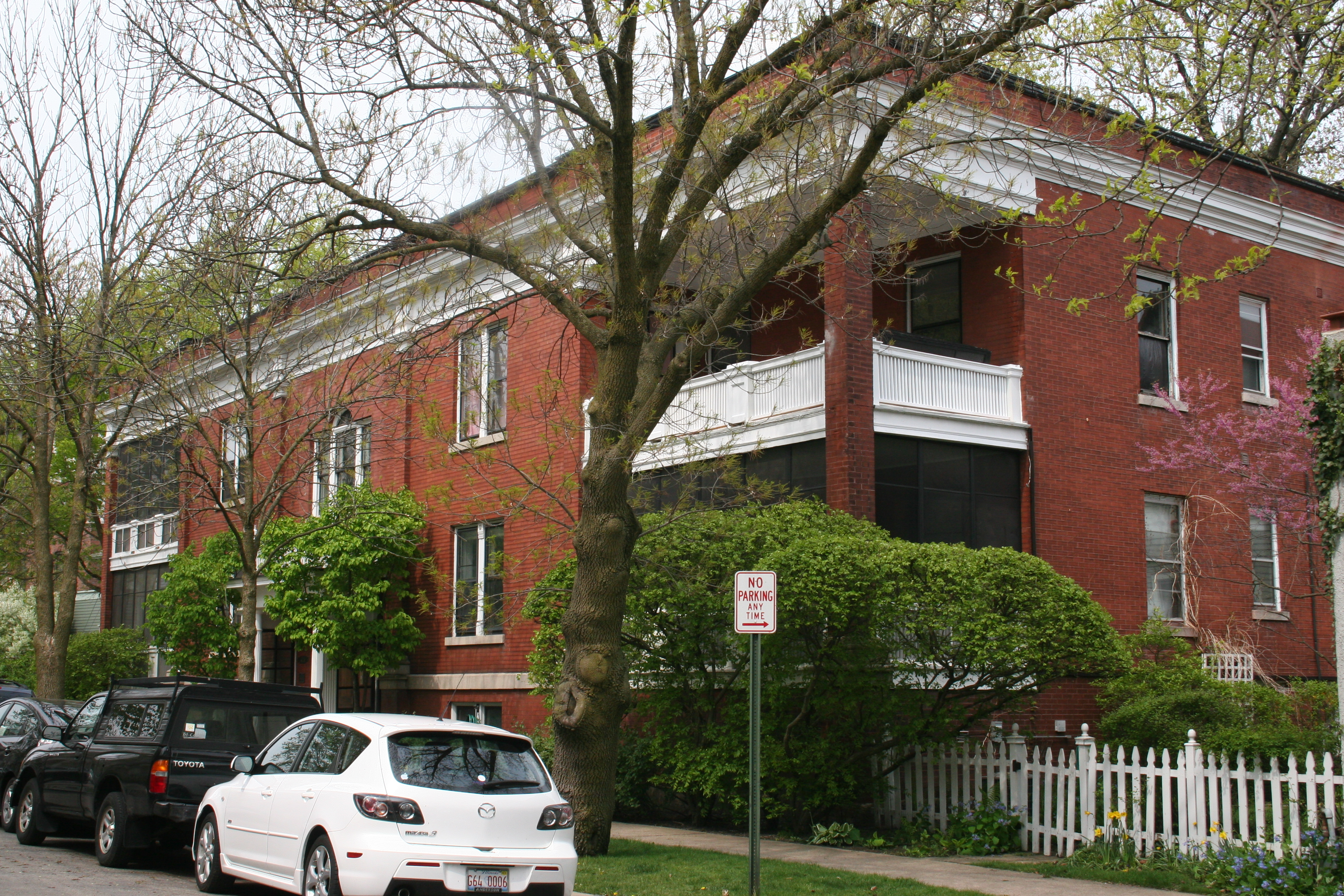
- Building at 417-419 Lee St. in 2012

- Location within Chicago metropolitan area Location within Illinois Location within the United States
- Location: 417–419 Lee St., Evanston, Illinois
- Coordinates: 42°02′10″N 87°40′39″W
- Area: 0.1 acres (0.040 ha)
- Built: 1902
- Architect: Edgar O. Blake
- MPS: Suburban Apartment Buildings in Evanston TR
- NRHP reference No.: 84000942
- Added to NRHP: March 15, 1984

The Building at 417–419 Lee Street is a historic apartment building in Evanston, Illinois. The two-story four-flat building was built in 1902. Architect Edgar O. Blake, an Evanston architect who had designed houses in the city since the 1870s, designed the building. The building's design includes a Georgian entrance with side columns, sidelights, and a fanlight, limestone banding, a wooden entablature, and a brick parapet. The four apartments are an early example of upper-class apartment design in Evanston; of particular note are its screened porches, which were a precursor to the sunrooms commonly seen in later buildings.

The building was added to the National Register of Historic Places on March 15, 1984.
