= Woodruff House (Cornwall, New York) =

Historic house in New York, United States

- U.S. National Register of Historic Places
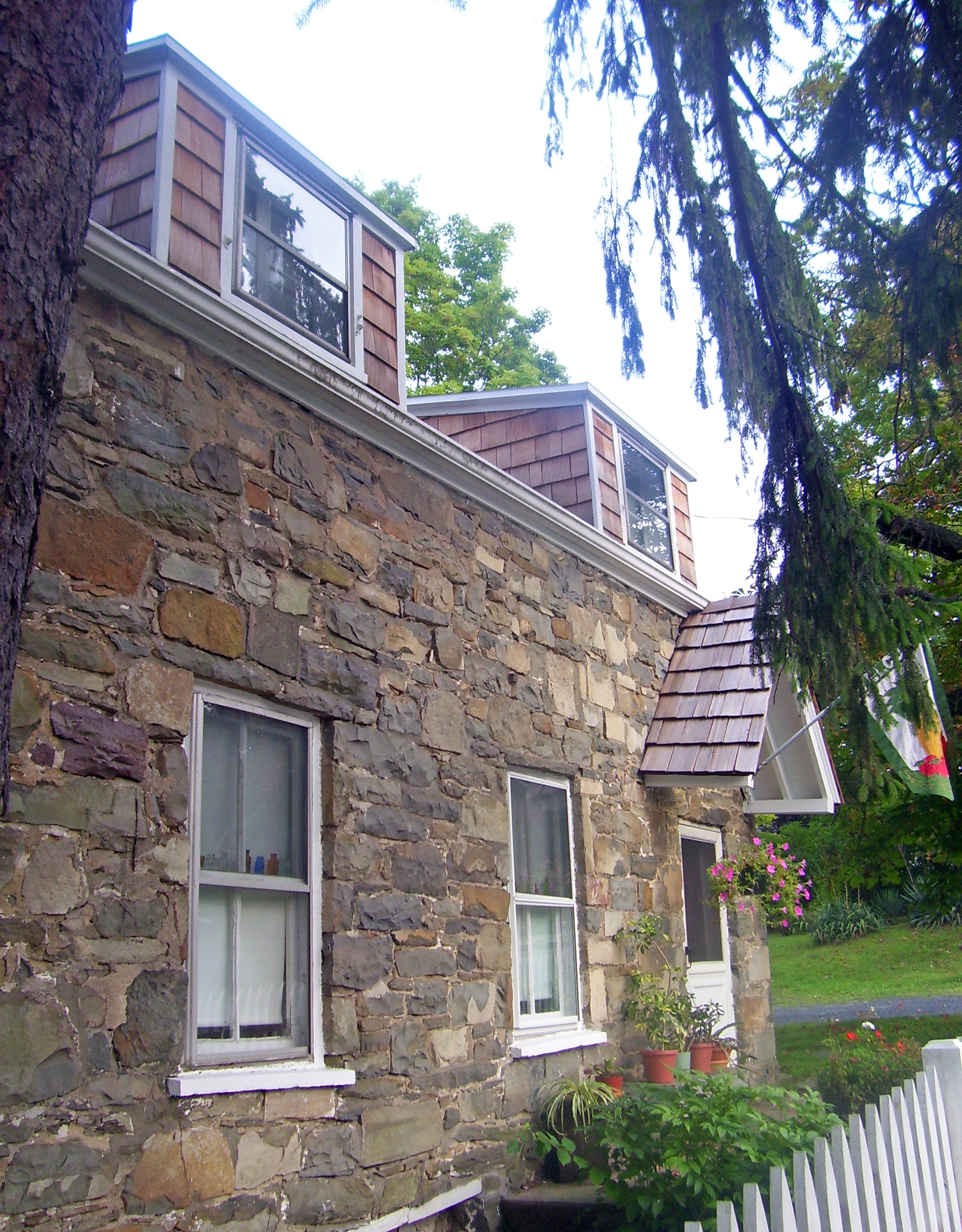
- East elevation, 2008

- Location within New York Location within the United States
- Location: Cornwall, New York
- Nearest city: Newburgh
- Coordinates: 41°26′33″N 74°3′21″W
- Built: ca. 1830
- MPS: Historic and Architectural Resources of Cornwall
- NRHP reference No.: 96000156
- Added to NRHP: 1996

The Woodruff House is located on NY 32 in Cornwall, New York, United States, a short distance south of the hamlet of Vails Gate. It is a small stone building dating to the early 19th century.

It is one of the few remaining stone houses from that period of the town's history. It was listed on the National Register of Historic Places in 1996.

== Building ==
The house is situated on a lot on the west side of Route 32, with a very short setback from the busy highway. Two large Norway spruce trees screen the front from the road. The surrounding area is mostly either open space or commercial, with some remaining residential property mixed in. To the west there are views of Schunemunk Mountain, Orange County's highest peak.

It is a one-and-a-half-story, three-bay structure, rectangular with a one-story frame addition on the west (rear) facade. The main block is sided in fieldstone. On all but the east (front) side it is not laid in any approximation of a pattern. On the east, there are large blocks approximating quoins on the corners and the stones are laid in an approximation of courses. It is topped by a flush gable roof, shingled in cedar shake with simple cornice pierced by two pent-roofed dormer windows and a single stone chimney.

The entrance is located in the northernmost of the three front bays. It has a small gabled portico also covered in shake. On the west, two identical dormers pierce the roof. The addition is sided in shake as well.

Behind a metal storm door is a wood paneled door. It leads to a side hall that opens on to living and dining rooms. They retain many original finishes, including wideboard flooring, hand-hewn ceiling beams, two fireplaces with Federal style mantels and marble surrounds, and both sawn and hand-hewn floor joists. In the cellar, an opening for the original Dutch oven is still visible. The rear wing houses a modern kitchen.

To the north is a clapboard-sided garage with a wood-shingled gabled roof. It is modern and not considered a contributing resource to the property's historic character.

== History ==
The first mention of the house is an 1856 sale from Benjamin Woodruff to Patrick McGonigal. The house was built in 1790, according to Orange County, NY, tax records. At the time the highway that would become Route 32 was already present.

It is one of the few small houses, and one of the only stone houses, remaining in Cornwall from the late 18th century. The rear wing was added in the 20th century; otherwise no significant changes have been made. McGonigal left it to his widow, Roseanne, at his death in 1868 and it has remained a private residence since.

== See also ==
- National Register of Historic Places listings in Orange County, New York
