= Screened porch =

Porch separated from outside mostly by screens

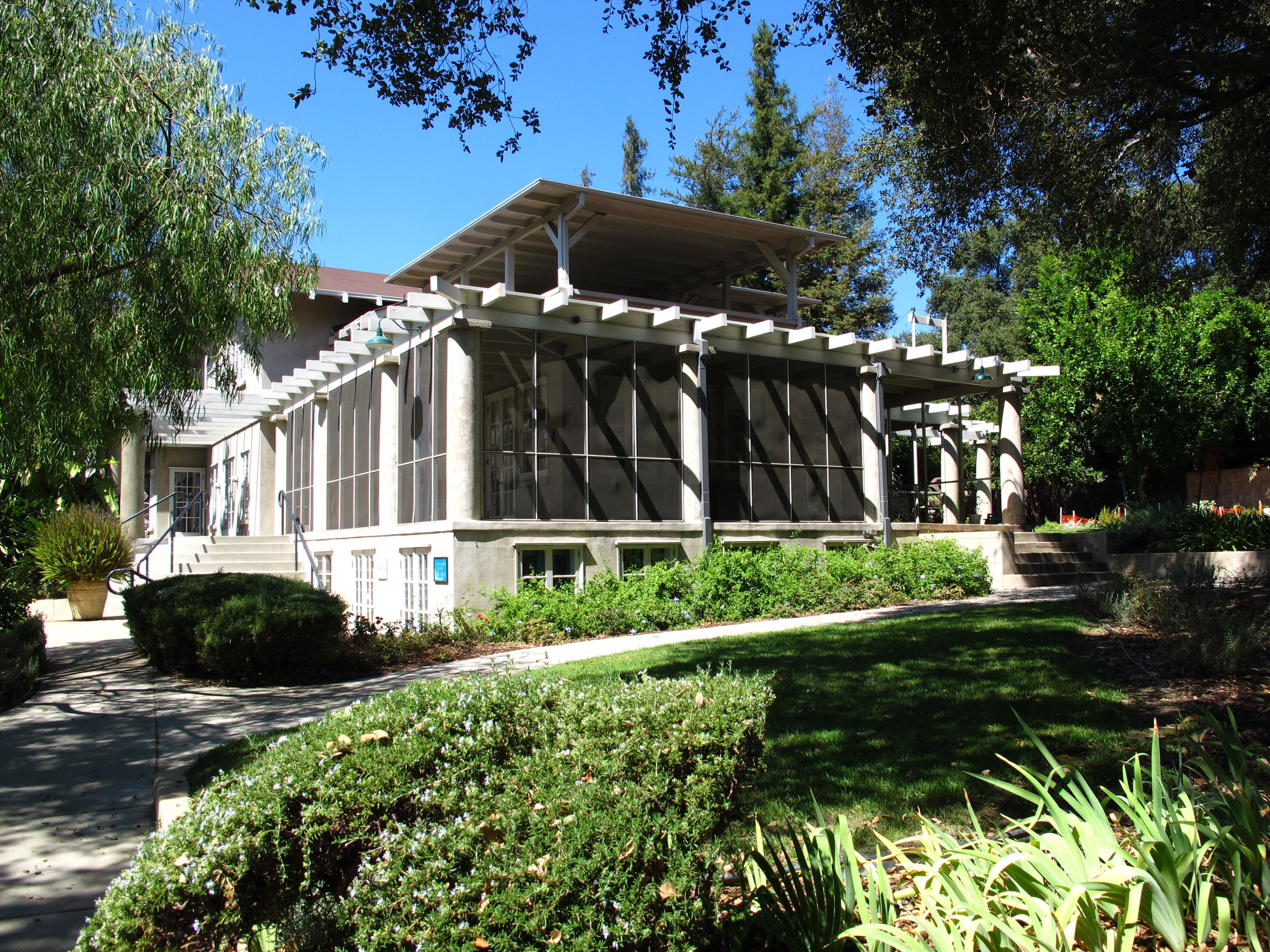
A screened porch on the rear of a house in the southwestern United States

A screened porch, also known as a screen room, is a type of porch or similar structure on or near the exterior of a house that has been covered by window screens in order to hinder insects, debris, and other undesirable objects from entering the area inside the screen. Typically created to enhance the livability of a structure that would otherwise be exposed to the annoyances of the outdoors, screened porches often permit residents to enjoy a hybrid indoor-outdoor environment.

== Construction ==
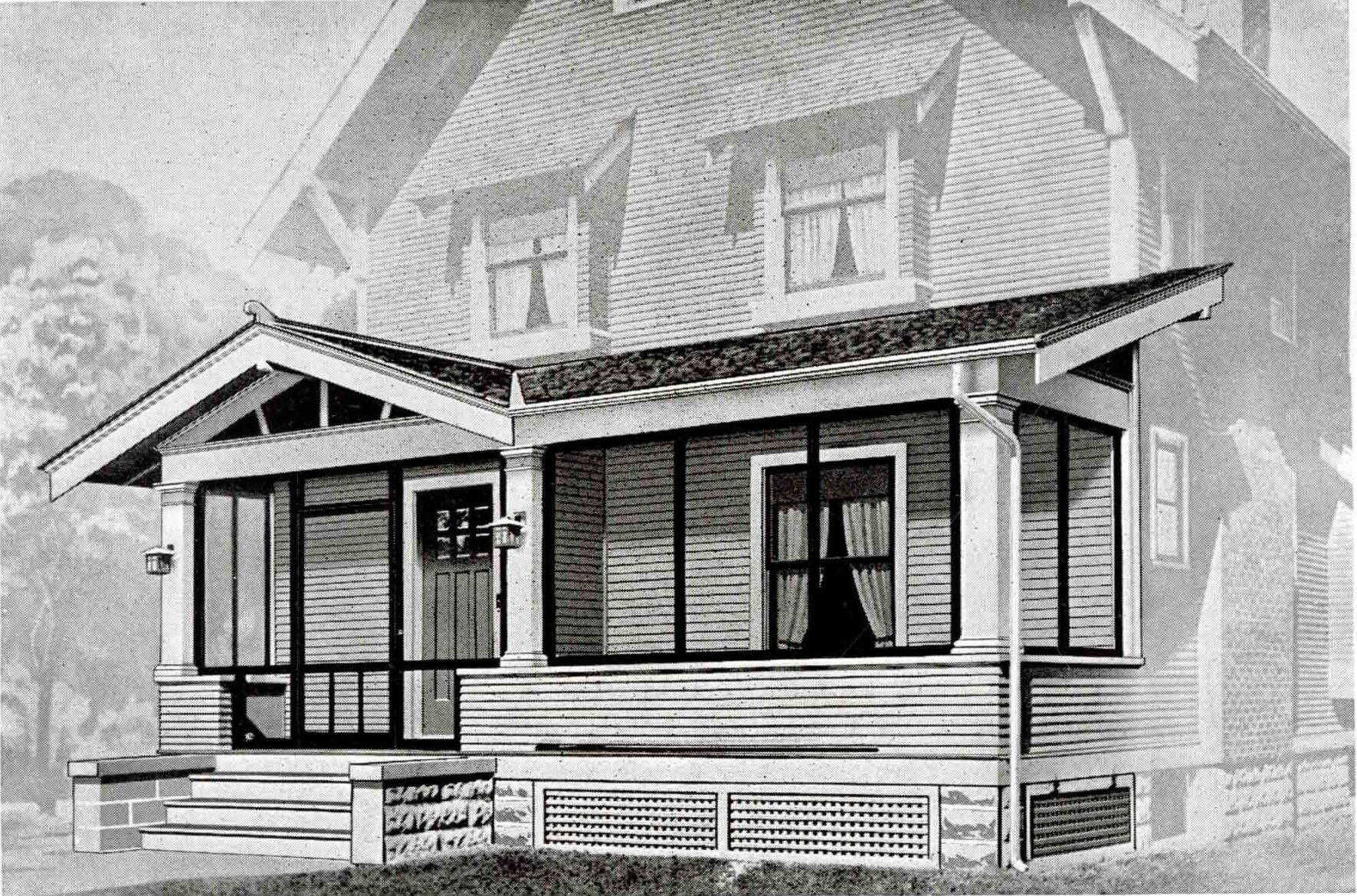
This is a catalog of "Bilt-well" mill work for the interior and exterior of homes. circa 1920

Screened porches can be built in a manner similar to that of pole barns, with the screens added after the structure of the walls and the roof is completed. While screen porches are often attached to houses, they are sometimes built separately in order to simplify the construction process. In order to ensure that the porch be impervious to insects and other intrusions, a screen door is typically added to facilitate entry. Because screens can reduce the amount of light that enters the porch's interior, some screened porches are built so that the screens can be removed at times when insects and sunlight are less of a problem to the resident. Some homeowners fill their porches with furniture and amenities typically found indoors, such as tables, chairs, and couches, ceiling fans, imitation hardwood floors, electrical outlets, painted elements, and even built-in furniture and plumbing.

It's nature up close, but not too personal.

— American designer Christopher Patrick

== Uses ==
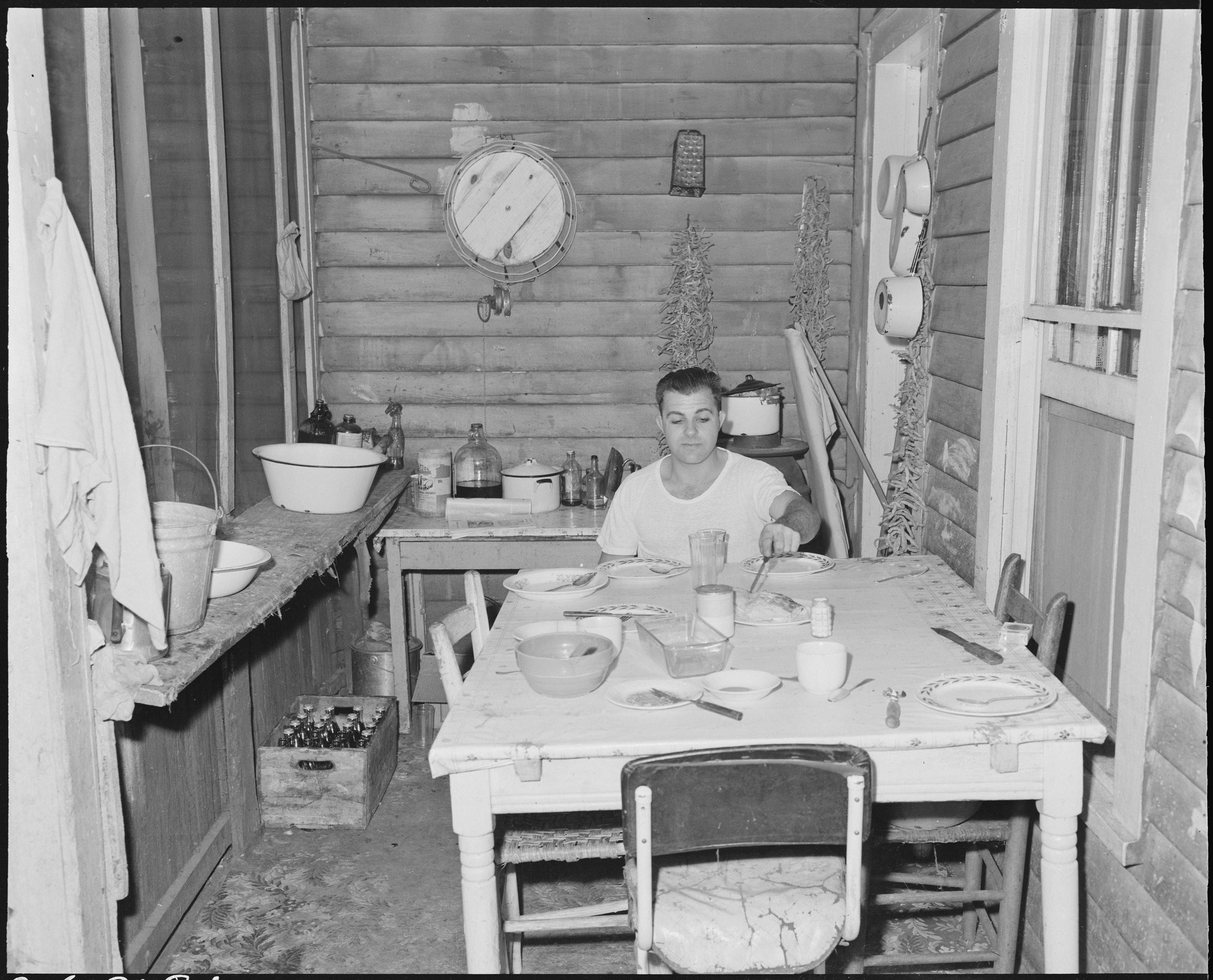
A man sits in his screened porch, which is filled with furniture.

Homeowners sometimes use their screened porches in lieu of climate control when the latter is unavailable. For example, when the loss of electricity prevents air conditioning systems from working, a screened porch may be a cooler sleeping location. At the same time, screened porches can be used to permit an outdoors experience while being sheltered from direct sunlight and flying insects; some builders even include skylights in their designs when a porch would otherwise be excessively dark. Some people experience a sense of intimacy and quiet privacy when spending their leisure hours on a screened porch. In the field of landscape architecture, a screened porch may even be used to divide surrounding gardens or lawns into smaller zones; at the Walter Gropius House in the northeastern United States, the screened porch serves as a transitional zone between a normal room of the house and a normal outdoors area, and its extended roof supports help to create the appearance of a frame around the surrounding terrain, dividing the land into multiple zones comparable to the rooms of a house.

== See also ==
- Arizona room
- Gazebo
- Sleeping porch
- Sunroom
