= Casa de Murillo =

Historical house in Seville, Spain

Coordinates: 37°23′8.5″N 5°59′20.5″W

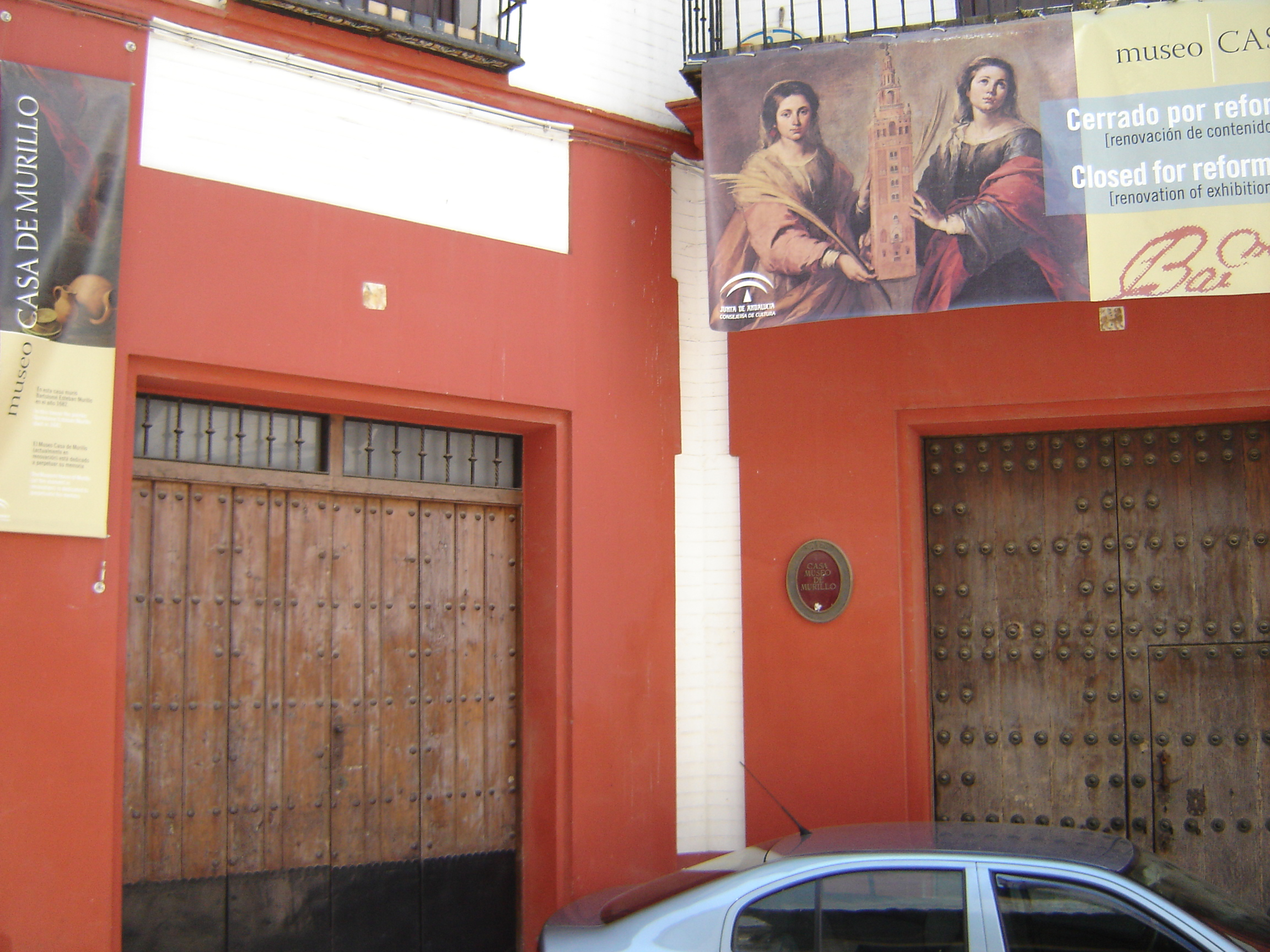
Casa de Murillo

The Casa de Murillo is a historical house in Seville, Andalusia, Spain, at number 8, calle Santa Teresa, in the historic Barrio de Santa Cruz. It was the home of the painter Bartolomé Esteban Murillo (1617–1682) in the latter years of his life. The building has two storeys and a central patio (courtyard) with columns.

A house museum was established there in 1972 and opened to the public in 1982, the tricentenary of Murillo's death. The museum attempted to recreate a 17th-century ambience. However, in 1998, most of the building was converted into offices for the Andalusian Council of Culture, leaving only a small museum space that is used for temporary exhibitions.
