= Storm cellar =

Type of shelter

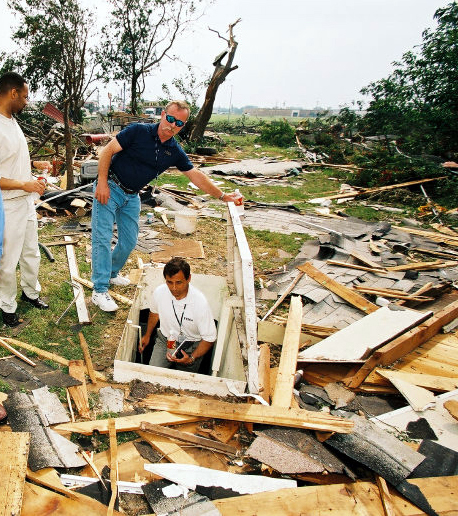
A storm cellar in Oklahoma City, in which a man safely sheltered while his house was destroyed by a 2003 tornado

A storm shelter or storm cellar is a type of underground bunker designed to protect the occupants from severe weather, particularly tornadoes. They are most frequently seen in the Midwest ("Tornado Alley") and Southeastern ("Dixie Alley") United States where tornadoes are generally frequent and the low water table permits underground living.

== Average storm shelter ==
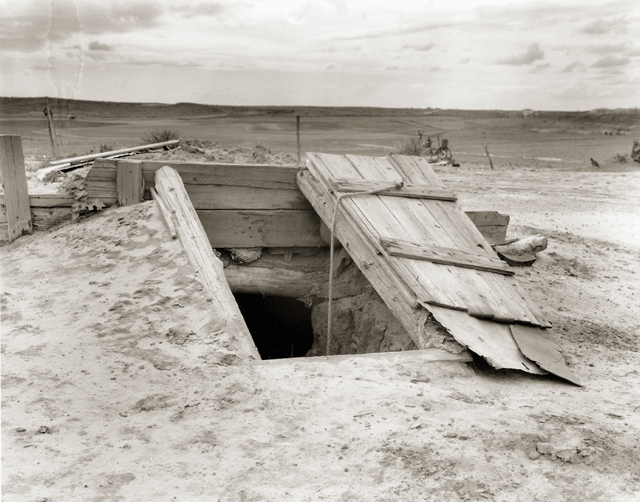
A storm cellar on the Texas plains, 1937

An average storm cellar for a single family is built close enough to the home to allow instant access in an emergency, but not so close that the house could tumble on the door during a storm, trapping the occupants inside. This is also the reason the main door on most storm cellars is mounted at an angle rather than perpendicular with the ground. An angled door allows for debris to blow up and over the door, or sand to slide off, without blocking it, and the angle also reduces the force necessary to open the door if rubble has piled up on top. The floor area is generally around eight by twelve feet (2.4 by 3.7 m), with an arched roof like that of a Quonset hut, but entirely underground. In most cases the entire structure is built of blocks faced with cement and rebar through the bricks for protection from the storm. Doing so makes it nearly impossible for the bricks to collapse. New ones are sometimes made of septic tanks that have been modified with a steel door and vents. Some new shelters are rotationally molded from polyethylene.

Most storm cellars are accessible by a covered stairwell, and at the opposite end of the structure there can be conduits for air that reach the surface, and perhaps a small window to serve as an emergency exit and also to provide some light. Storm cellars, when connected to the house, may potentially compromise security.

Fully enclosed underground storm shelters offer superior tornado protection to that of a traditional basement (cellar) because they provide separate overhead cover without the risk of occupants being trapped or killed by collapsing rubble from above. For this reason they also provide the only reliable form of shelter against EF5 tornadoes which tend to rip the house from its foundation, removing the overhead cover which was protecting the occupant.

There are several different styles of storm cellars. There are the generic underground storm/tornado cellar, also called storm or tornado shelters, as well as the new above-ground safe rooms. A "cellar" is an underground unit, but for the sake of the specified use of a "storm cellar" to protect one from high-wind storms, it seems relevant to mention saferooms. There are two basic styles of underground storm cellars. One is the "hillside" or "embankment" and the other is the "flat" ground.

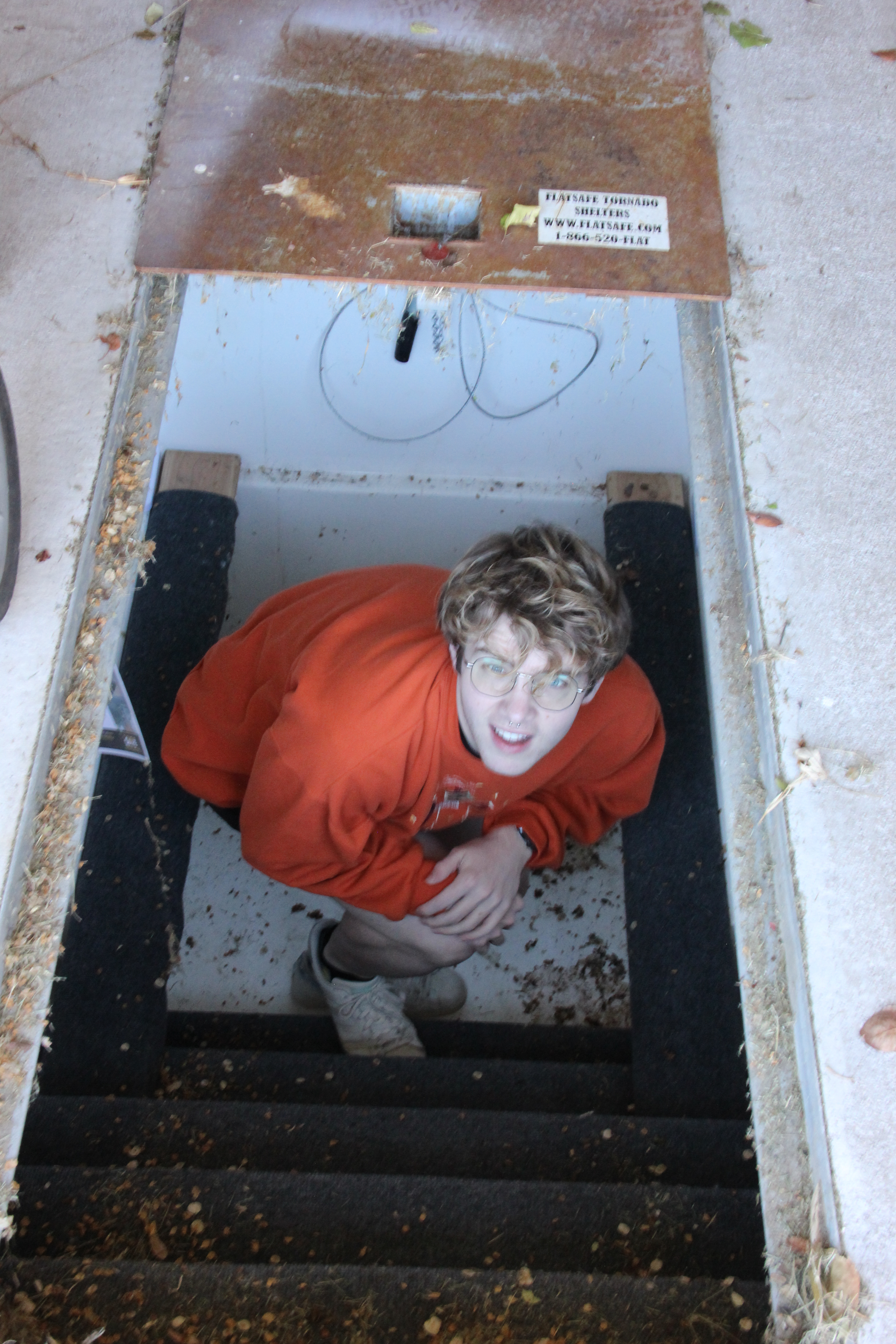
Midwesterner demonstrates undergarage storm cellar

One other style of shelter is the under garage. While similar to other underground shelters, its main difference is that it is installed in a garage rather than outside. Having it installed in the garage allows access to it without having to go outside during a storm. It is sometimes not an option to have a shelter installed outside either due to insufficient space, or local ordinances.

=== Hillside/embankment shelters ===
Hillside or embankment models are usually installed in one of two ways. It can be installed in an existing hill/embankment or dirt is built up around a freestanding unit, forming a hill around it. The door can be set at an angle or vertically. There can be steps leading into the unit, or it can be installed to where the floor is level with the ground outside. The embankment storm cellar can be made from concrete, steel, fiberglass, or any other structurally sound material or composite and is usually installed in a hill or embankment, leaving only the door exposed. In some situations, they can hold an entire neighborhood or town as with a community shelter. More often, they are built to hold one or two families, specified as a residential shelter. All underground "storm or tornado" shelters must be properly anchored.

=== Above ground shelters ===
Above ground shelters are used in many areas of the country and by a wide variety of homeowners and businesses. Groundwater tables may make it impossible to install or build a shelter below ground, elderly or people with limited mobility may be unable to access a below ground shelter, or people may have significant phobias pertaining to below ground sheltering. FEMA P-320, Taking Shelter from the Storm: Building a Safe Room for Your Home or Small Business (2014) and ICC/NSSA Standard for the Design and Construction of Storm Shelters provide engineering and testing requirements to ensure that above ground shelters manufactured to the published specifications will withstand winds in excess of 250 mph (400 km/h) (EF5 tornado). Above ground shelters may be built of different materials such as steel reinforced concrete or 1/8" 10 ga. hot rolled steel and may be installed inside a home, garage, or outbuilding, or as a stand-alone unit. These types of shelters are typically prefabricated and installed on a home site or commercial location. Walls can be provided which form a deflector baffle entry so that the path of the storm debris must touch two impact resistant surfaces before it penetrates into the protected area of the occupants.

Wind engineering specialists from Texas Tech University's National Wind Institute have done extensive research that concludes that sheltering in an above ground storm shelter that meets the engineering criteria outlined in FEMA Pub. 320 and 361 and ICC/NSSA Standard for the Design and Construction of Storm Shelters is as safe as seeking below ground shelter during massive EF4 and EF5 tornadoes. TTU engineer Joseph Dannemiller presented the research findings at a TEDxTexasTechUniversity symposium in February 2014.

=== Below-ground shelters ===
The below-ground shelters are designed so that the door is flat with the ground and can be made from any one of the materials previously described. This unit is put in a hole deep enough to cover the bottom section, and then the excavated dirt is filled in around the top and packed down. Storm shelters must be designed, built, tested, and installed properly for them to meet any of the US FEMA-320, FEMA-361, ICC-500, NPCTS (National Performance Criteria for Tornado Shelters), or ICC/NSSA Standards.

=== Geolocation services ===
Many storm shelter manufacturers include geolocation services or incorporate GPS technologies to assist in ensuring recovery from the shelter after a storm or other catastrophic event. In addition, shelter owners may opt to incorporate their own geolocation services in their shelter. Shelter owners can provide their shelter's GPS coordinates to an emergency response center that is linked to a nationwide severe weather notification system. If a storm occurs, the emergency response center places a phone call to the shelter owner and then secondary contacts, lastly contacting local emergency response if unable to contact the shelter owner.

== Additional uses ==
Functionally underground bunkers, storm cellars are readily provisioned as bomb shelters and/or fallout shelters (although they are not usually dug as deeply or equipped with filtered ventilation, respectively). Since their underground construction makes them steadily cool and dark, storm cellars on farmsteads in the Midwest and elsewhere have been used as root cellars to store seasonal canned goods for consumption during the winter, with mixed results.

== See also ==
- Storm door
- Storm drain
- Storm room
- Storm windows
- Tornado preparedness
- Hurricane preparedness
