= Low Income Home Energy Assistance Program =

United States federal social services program

Administration for Children and Families logo

The Low Income Home Energy Assistance Program (LIHEAP, pronounced "lie" "heap") is a United States federal social services program first established in 1981 and funded annually through Congressional appropriations. The mission of LIHEAP is to assist low income households, particularly those with the lowest incomes that pay a high proportion of household income for home energy, primarily in meeting their immediate home energy needs. The program, part of the United States Department of Health and Human Services (HHS), is funded by grants appropriated from the federal government.

Weatherization funding peaked to over 500 million dollars in 2009 and by 2014 had decreased to about 300. In 2014, it served over 80 thousand households in over 40 states, out of over 5 million in the LIHEAP program. Funding during the COVID pandemic reached $8 billion in 2021 and was about $4 billion a year during the rest of the presidency of Joe Biden. In total since 1976, weatherization assisted over 7 million low-income households, which received free home improvements worth an average of about $5,000. The most common measures were furnace replacement, attic and wall insulation, and infiltration reduction. A random trial in Michigan estimated that the measures reduced energy consumption by 10-20 % on average.

In 2025, the Trump administration proposed ending the program.

== Funding distribution ==
Funding is distributed to each of the fifty states, U.S. territories and tribal governments through the Department of Health and Human Services (HHS). Administration of the program is left up to state, territorial or tribal governments. Congress also provides the President with limited contingency funds each year, which are reserved for emergency situations and released at the President's discretion.

LIHEAP offers one-time financial assistance to qualifying low-income households who require support in paying their home heating or cooling bills. Applicants must have an income less than 150% of federal poverty level or 60% of state median poverty level to be eligible, however some states have expanded their programs to include more households (for example, in Massachusetts, applicants must be within 60% of the estimated State Median Income).

LIHEAP provides funding assistance to low-income households, targeting those who are truly vulnerable: the disabled, elderly, and families with preschool-age children. Funding is distributed to states or other governmental entities, who administer the program and stems from four sources including: Block grants, the Residential Energy Assistance Challenge Program, Contingency Funds, and Leveraging Incentive Programs. Allocations are based on local climate, economic, and demographic formulas. Additional funds may be available in emergency situations or as match funds when contributions are provided by local governments, private businesses, or non-profit organizations. Final distribution of funds is conducted through the program grantees, which are able to design their programs to meet consumer needs while adhering to the goals and policies of LIHEAP.

=== State administration ===
State legislatures often provide additional appropriations each year to supplement federal LIHEAP funds. In most states, the program is run on a first come-first served basis. This typically results in a rush to apply and receive assistance, because once the funding pool is empty most energy assistance offices close their doors. In some states, the legislature or governor may make a politically popular gesture of extending eligibility to additional individuals through an emergency bill or executive order, even though this may result in funds being claimed earlier in the winter season.

The Home Energy Assistance Target (H.E.A.T.) program is the State of Utah's program through which funds are distributed to the target population. This program is specifically administered by the state and various Associations of Governments (AOG). The Mountain land AOG provides H.E.A.T. assistance to persons in Utah, Wasatch, and Summit Counties.

Many state LIHEAP agencies also offer weatherization support, in which contractors are sent to residences to make physical changes to help retain heat or install more fuel-efficient furnaces. Occasionally, acceptance of the weatherization process is mandatory with approval for LIHEAP assistance.

Some states have attempted to enact Percentage of Income Payment (PIP) plans within or in addition to the traditional LIHEAP block grant model. Although overall funding has increased since 2002, future funding may be limited due to the recent trend in cutting the budget based on building codes requiring energy efficiency, modern appliances with low energy use standards, and concerns about federal budget sustainability. As the program moves forward, the budget being cut along with the rise of applicants are the two major challenges it faces.

== History ==
LIHEAP history began in 1980 when congress created the Low Income Energy Assistance Program (LIEAP), as part of the Crude Oil Windfall Profits Tax Act to answer the concerns of the rising energy prices of the 1970s. In 1981, LIEAP was replaced with LIHEAP as part of the Omnibus Budget Reconciliation Act. In 1984, the Human Services Reauthorization Act added a new goal to provide funds for cooling costs of low-income households. Congress also required the use of more recent population and energy data, which meant the shifting of funds from solely cold-weather states to warm-weather states.

== Administration ==
LIHEAP is administered by the Department of Health and Human Services. Several federal divisions provide oversight and direction to the program. These include the Administration for Children and Family Services, the Office of Community Services, and the Division of Energy Assistance. The federal government does not provide LIHEAP assistance to the public. Instead, the federal government provides funds to states, federal or state-recognized Indian tribes, tribal organizations, and insular areas to administer.

Groups who receive funds are considered grantees in the program. LIHEAP grantees have flexibility to design their programs, within very broad federal guidelines, to meet the needs of their citizens. Each state may have varying departments or divisions to disseminate funds. Shown above is the program flow from the federal to local level in the State of Utah. In Utah, LIHEAP funding is managed through the Home Energy Assistance Target (HEAT) program, which is handled by the state or Association of Governments (AOG). The Mountainland AOG provides direct oversight for assistance to local government agencies in Utah, Wasatch, and Summit Counties. MAG receives nearly $2.5 Million annually. State of Illinois has announced in 2014 that residents can apply at two area agencies; a single-person household can qualify with a monthly income of up to $1,459; a two-person household up to $1,966; a family of three can earn up to $2,474; and a family of four can earn up to $2,981.

== Federal funding ==
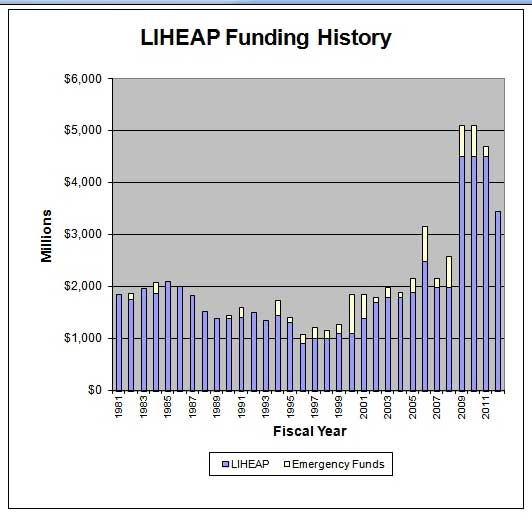

LIHEAP is funded by annual appropriations to the Department of Health & Human Services. The funding for the fiscal year 2017 is $3.09 billion.

Funding is distributed to each of the fifty states, U.S. territories and tribal governments through the United States Department of Health and Human Services (HHS). Administration of the program is left up to state, territorial or tribal governments. Congress also provides the President of the United States with limited contingency funds each year, which are reserved for emergency situations and released at the President's discretion. State legislatures often provide additional appropriations each year to supplement federal LIHEAP funds.

=== Funding sources ===
The amount of funding available for actual assistance comes from four major sources including: Block grants, the Residential Energy Assistance Challenge Program, Contingency Funds, and Leveraging Incentive Programs. The following is a synopsis of how these sources tie into LIHEAP.

=== Block grants ===
Block grants account for the majority of dollars distributed for the LIHEAP program. To be granted a block grant, states, territories, Indian tribes, and tribal organizations that wish to assist low-income households in meeting the costs of home energy, may apply for a LIHEAP block grant.

=== Residential Energy Assistance Challenge Program (REACH) ===
The Residential Energy Assistance Challenge Program (REACH) "provides grants that fund demonstration projects to test various approaches to help low-income families reduce their energy usage and become more self-sufficient in meeting their home energy needs." Local community-based agencies that implement innovative plans to help LIHEAP eligible households reduce their energy vulnerability can receive these funds.

As of 2001, 54 REACH grants had been funded creating an annual budget of $6 Million, or one half of a one percent of the total funding for the LIHEAP program. These grants have been used to create weatherization materials, workshops on energy efficiency measures for homes, budget counseling, and have formed consumer cooperatives to purchase home energy. State projects run for three years, and state grantees are required to contract for third-party evaluations and to report after the conclusion of the project on the effectiveness of the approaches that they have tried.

=== Contingency funding ===
Contingency funds are funds that are released to assist with home energy needs due to emergency situations. They may be allocated to one or more grantees, or to all grantees, based on criteria appropriate to the nature of the emergency. Generally, these funds are released in response to extreme weather conditions or energy price increases. In the 1980s, contingency funding was only used twice. In the 1990s, it was used eight times, and since the year 2000 there has been a call for contingency funding every year.

=== Leveraging Incentive Program ===
The Leveraging Incentive Program is designed to reward those grantees that have acquired non-federal leveraged resources for their LIHEAP programs.

It encourages grantees to look for ways to add non-federal dollars or other resources to their LIHEAP programs. Additionally, grantees are encouraged to integrate and coordinate with other energy assistance programs to provide non-federal energy assistance to low-income households who meet LIHEAP eligibility criteria. Participation in this program is optional, but if non-federal dollars are reported, the grantee can receive additional LIHEAP funds. An example of this program is to leverage a discount on wood that is negotiated by a tribal LIHEAP coordinator with a wood supplier. The amount of the discount, given to LIHEAP eligible households, would be reported as a leveraged or non-federal resource and be eligible for additional funding to the tribe.

== How LIHEAP and WAP work together ==
Low Income Home Energy Assistance Programs (LIHEAP) and Weatherization Assistance Programs (WAP) work together to help low-income individuals and families pay energy bills and reduce energy costs. This article gives of overview of each program and describes how they work together. LIHEAP and WAP literature is also examined. Finally, a section detailing literacy in low-income consumers is included.

=== Overview of LIEAP ===
The mission of the Low Income Energy Assistance Program (LIEAP) (also known as Low Income Home Energy Assistance Program (LIHEAP)), created in 1981, is to assist low income households, particularly those with the lowest incomes that pay a high proportion of household income for home energy, primarily in meeting their immediate home energy needs. The program, part of the United States Department of Health and Human Services (DHHS), is funded by grants appropriated from the federal government.

LIHEAP pays partial winter energy bills for eligible individuals and families. Payments are usually made directly to local utility companies or vendors. To be eligible, an individual's income level must not be more than 150% of the federal poverty level. The payment amount is figured according to the size and type of your home, as well as type of fuel.

A press release from the Department of Health and Human Services on June 5, 2013, indicates that $187.4 million was released to states to help low-income homeowners and renters with rising energy costs. This funding supplements $3.065 billion in grants made available earlier in the year through the Low-Income Home Energy Assistance Program (LIHEAP).

The funding serves to help families pay their heating and electricity, as well as make weather-related improvements to their homes. This helps to prevent these families from having service interruptions.

George Shelton, HHS acting assistant secretary for the Administration for Children and Families, stated that high temperatures translate into high energy bills for families who are already struggling to make ends meet.

=== Overview of the Weatherization Assistance Program (WAP) ===
The United States Weatherization Assistance Program (WAP) was created in 1976 to help low-income families reduce energy consumption and costs. WAP is governed by various federal regulations designed to help manage and account for the resources provided by the Department of Energy (DOE). WAP funding is derived from annual appropriations from Congress. Each year, the Senate and House Interior Appropriations committees decide how much funding to allocate to the Program.

Certified Energy Auditors perform energy audits on a home to help locate efficiency problems. Once an audit is complete, the program can help by insulating walls and windows, replacing broken glass, and testing, repairing, and/or replacing combustion appliances. Like the LIHEAP, an individual's income level must be at or below 150% of the federal poverty level to be eligible for the WAP. Many state WAPs and LIHEAPs work together to provide the best energy services for low-income households.

Weatherization measures may include caulking, weather-stripping, insulation, vent dampers, replacement of broken glass, repair or replacement of primary doors, and furnace tune-ups. Weatherization workers may not be able to install all the materials, but they will do the most important weatherization within the dollar limits allowed.

When a home is scheduled for weatherization service, a crew will come to install the necessary materials in the home. After the work is completed, the client will be asked to sign a statement saying the work was done properly and to the client's satisfaction. Surveys have shown that weatherizing a home can significantly decrease winter heating or energy bills.

=== Enrollment in LIHEAP and WAP ===
LIHEAP and WAP are the cornerstones of any public energy assistance program. Often, the two programs not only work together, they automatically encompass each other. At the Montana energy assistance offices, clients are automatically enrolled in the WAP when they are enrolled in the LIHEAP.

This association is fitting being that the LIHEAP and WAP are usually located in the same office. In Butte, Montana, the Energy Assistance office and Weatherization departments (which are part of the Human Resources Council, District XII) are in charge of LIHEAP and WAP. Each department offers several other programs that assist low-income individuals and families with heating and energy issues.

When a client completes and turns in an application for LIHEAP, they are automatically enrolled in WAP. After the application is processed, it usually takes one to two weeks to receive financial assistance for their heating and energy bills. During this time, the applicant is contacted by the WAP department. Before a client's home can be weatherized, an auditor comes to the home to complete an energy audit. The auditor is trained to determine the most cost-efficient weatherization measures for the home.

Besides working together to provide energy assistance, LIHEAP and WAP programs around the country provide information about energy conservation such as tips including replacing light bulbs with LED light bulbs and using Energy Star appliances.

== Energy costs ==
While the program administrators use the above measures and reports to understand how the program is working, there is greater concern that not enough funding is being brought into the program to stave off increases in fuel prices. The 2008 spike in funding was needed to address the sharp increase in home heating oil. The recent decrease in allocations prior to 2008 levels may not be enough to handle the continued climbing of heating costs and its effect on many households with low incomes.

Not only are fuel prices continuing to increase, program recipients are on the rise. This may be illustrated in the following chart showing the increase in households served by the program in relation to the amount of LIHEAP funds allocated to the State of Utah. Some statistics of note for the State of Utah include:

- SEALworks recorded that 1,619 households were shut off before coming in for HEAT assistance
- HEAT program helped prevent 10,243 households, that had shut off notices, from being shut off
- Almost $375,769 in regular HEAT Crisis assistance assisted 1,373 families in 2011
- The program served 18,592 families with young children in 2011
- The program assisted 10,875 elderly households to receive HEAT assistance in 2011
- The program assisted 17,947 people who have disabilities in 2011

Coordination with Outside Programs

In addition to providing matching funds through the Leveraging Incentive Program, LIHEAP strives to coordinate efforts with private utility companies and non-profits where federal funding is not available.
