= Sunroom =

Room with large glass windows or walls for sunlight

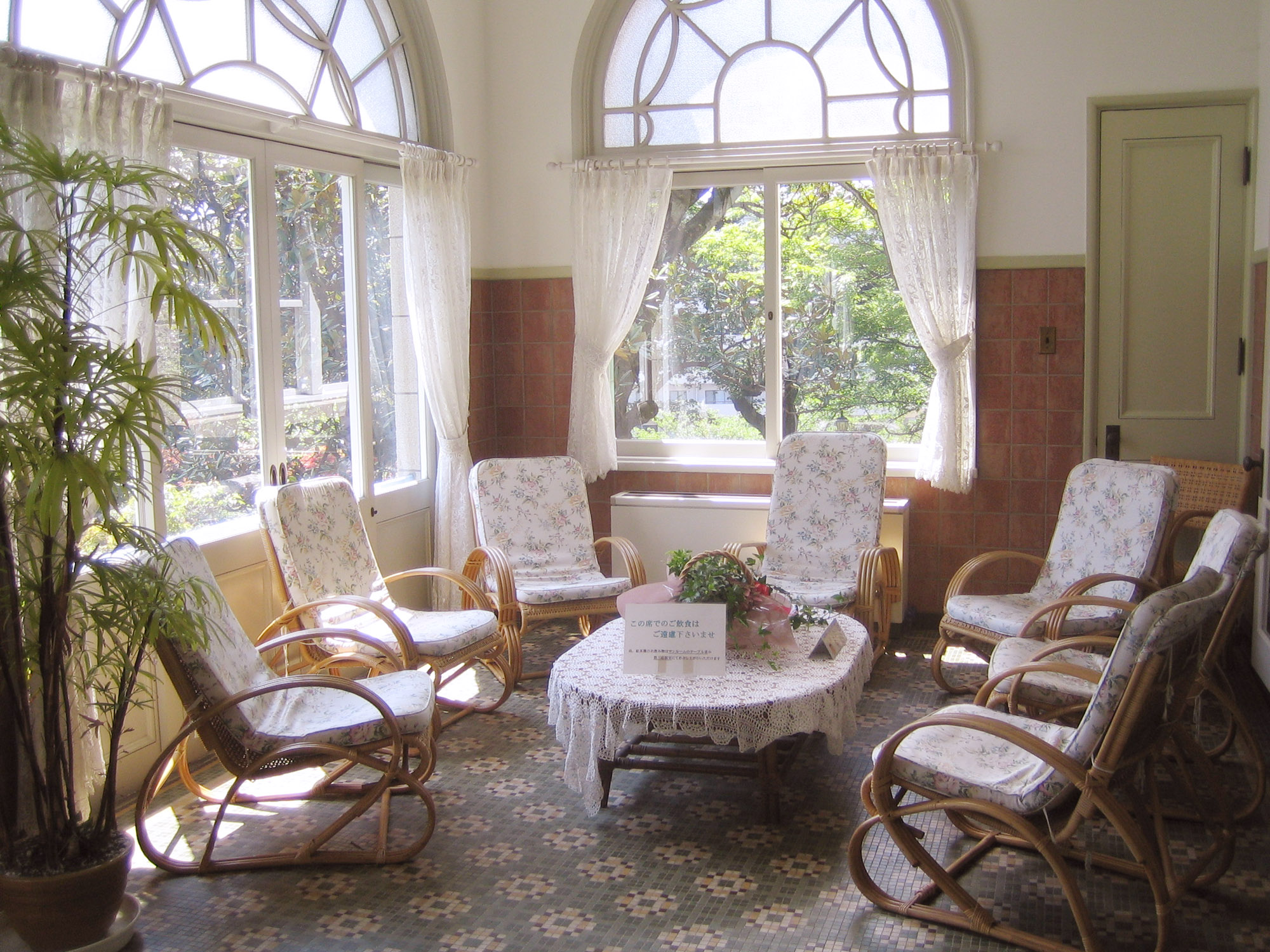
A sunroom in Hatoyama Hall, Tokyo, Japan

A sunroom, also frequently called a solarium (and sometimes a "Florida room", "garden conservatory", "garden room", "patio room", "sun parlor", "sun porch", "three season room" or "winter garden"), is a room that permits abundant daylight and views of the landscape while sheltering from adverse weather. Sunroom and solarium have the same denotation: solarium is Latin for "place of sun[light]". Solaria of various forms have been erected throughout European history. Currently, the sunroom or solarium is popular in Europe, Canada, the United States, Australia, and New Zealand. Sunrooms may feature passive solar building design to heat and illuminate them.

In Great Britain, which has a long history of formal conservatories, a small conservatory is sometimes denominated a "sunroom". In gardening, a garden room is a secluded and partly enclosed outside space within a garden that creates a room-like effect.

== Design ==
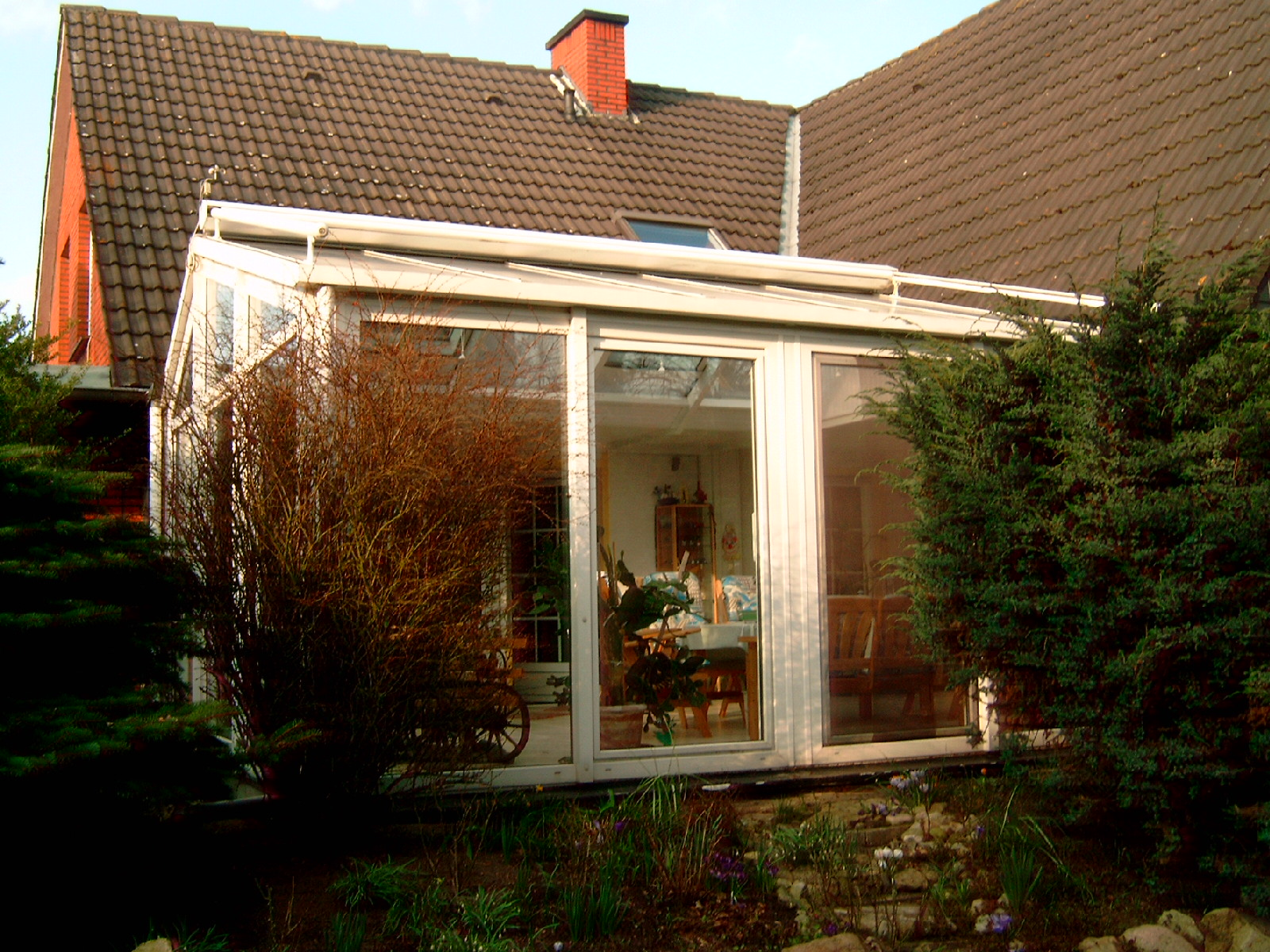
A German "Wintergarten" with open blinds and anemometer (top left)

Attached sunrooms typically are constructed of transparent tempered glazing atop a brick or wood "knee wall" or framed entirely of wood, aluminum, or PVC, and glazed on all sides. Frosted glass or glass block may be used to add privacy. Screens are a fundamental aspect of a "Florida room", and jalousie windows are often featured. An integrated sunroom is specifically designed with many windows and climate controls.

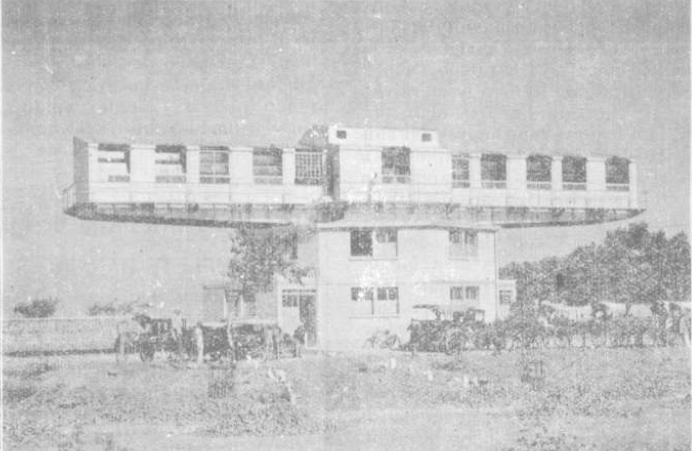
Revolving solarium in Jamnagar, India designed by Jean Saidman

A solarium is typically distinguished from a sunroom by the former being specifically and primarily designed to collect sunlight for warmth and light as opposed to being primarily designed to feature scenic views, and by being composed of walls, save one, and a roof that are entirely of framed glass. These typically are erected in higher latitude (low angle of sunlight) or cold (higher altitude) locations. In contrast, a sunroom sensu stricto has an opaque roof.

== Technologies ==
During the 1960s, professional re-modelling companies developed affordable systems to enclose a patio or deck, offering design, installation, and full service warranties. Patio rooms featured lightweight, engineered roof panels, single pane glass, and aluminium construction.

As technology advanced, insulated glass, vinyl, and vinyl-wood composite framework appeared. More recently, specialized blinds and curtains have been developed, many electrically operated by remote control. Specialized flooring, including radiant heat, may be adapted to both attached and integrated sunrooms.

== See also ==
- Arizona room
- Conservatory (greenhouse)
- Observation car
- Porch
- Smart glass
- Orangery
