= Home Energy Assistance Target =

Social assistance program in Utah, U.S.

The Home Energy Assistance Target (H.E.A.T.) program is the State of Utah’s program through which funds are distributed to the target population. This program is specifically administered by the state and various Associations of Governments (AOG). The Mountain land AOG provides H.E.A.T. assistance to persons in Utah, Wastach, and Summit Counties. MAG receives nearly $2.5 Million annually.

== Recipients ==
Program recipients are on the rise. This may be illustrated in the following chart showing the increase in households served by the program in relation to the amount of LIHEAP funds allocated to the State of Utah. Some statistics of note for the State of Utah include:

- SEALworks recorded that 1,619 households were shut off before coming in for HEAT assistance
- HEAT program helped prevent 10,243 households, that had shut off notices, from being shut off
- Almost $375,769 in regular HEAT Crisis assistance assisted 1,373 families in 2011
- The program served 18,592 families with young children in 2011
- The program assisted 10,875 elderly households to receive HEAT assistance in 2011
- The program assisted 17,947 people who have disabilities in 2011

== Coordination with outside programs ==
In addition to providing matching funds through the Leveraging Incentive Program, LIHEAP strives to coordinate efforts with private utility companies and non-profits where federal funding is not available. In the State of Utah, some of these other sources include Rocky Mountain Power’s Home Electric Lifeline and Lend-a-Hand Programs, Questar’s Energy Assistance Fund and REACH program, Catholic Community Services, American Red Cross, and Murray City Relief Program. H.E.A.T. funding applicants may be referred to these or other private assistance groups if there are not sufficient LIHEAP funds.

== Sources ==
- LIHEAP Clearinghouse (2012, October 3). Utahns to Get Reduced LIHEAP Benefit. Retrieved from LIHEAP Clearinghouse: https://web.archive.org/web/20160303235006/http://liheap.ncat.org/news/mar11/utah.htm
- Hansell, D. A. (2012). FY 2012 Online Performance Appendix. Washington D.C: Department of Health and Human Services.
- Henetz, P. (2011, October 7). Less Federal Help Expected for Low-Income Utahns’ Heating Bills. Retrieved from The Salt Lake Tribune: http://www.sltrib.com/sltrib/news/53201355-78/federal-income-low-utah.html.csp Perl, L. (2010).
- The LIHEAP Formula: Legislative History and Current Law. Washington D.C.: Congressional Research Service. Retrieved from https://web.archive.org/web/20120417031043/http://www.neada.org/publications/2010-07-06.pdf
- U.S. Department of Health and Human Services Administration Services, (2012, October 5). LIHEAP Fact Sheet. Retrieved from Office of Community Services an Office of the Administration for Children and Families:
- U.S. Department of Health and Human Services Administration Services for Children & Families, (2012, October 2). Retrieved from LIHEAP Clearing House: https://web.archive.org/web/20121018090108/http://liheap.ncat.org/wwa.htm
- Stone, C., Sherman, A., & Shaw, H. (2011, February 18). Administration's Rationale for Severe Cut in Low-Income Home Energy Assistance Is Weak. Retrieved September 19, 2012, from Budget and Policy Priorities: http://www.cbpp.org/cms/index.cfm?fa=view&id=3406
- Wein, O. (2012, October 1). The Low Income Home Energy Assistance Program (LIHEAP). Retrieved from National Consumer Law Center: http://www.nclc.org/images/pdf/energy_utility_telecom/liheap/liheap-2page.pdf
