= Arizona room =

Screened porch

An Arizona room is a screened porch found frequently in homes in Arizona, based on similar concepts as the Florida room.

Though often a patio or porch that has been covered and screened-in, creating an outdoor feeling while preventing excessive heat and keeping insects and animals out, many Arizona rooms are purpose built at the time the house is constructed. The room generally borders the backyard or side yard of the house and is often accessed directly from the living room, kitchen or other common room of the home.

== User ==
According to Phoenix newspaper The Arizona Republic, residents slept in their Arizona room during the summer months, before the advent of air conditioning, because the flow of cool night air made them more comfortable than in an enclosed bedroom.

== Decoration ==
Arizona rooms are often decorated with Southwestern decor and furniture, and reflect the casual, informal style characteristic of the Southwest.

== See also ==
- Screened porch
- Sleeping porch
