= Sleeping porch =

Deck or balcony for outdoor sleeping

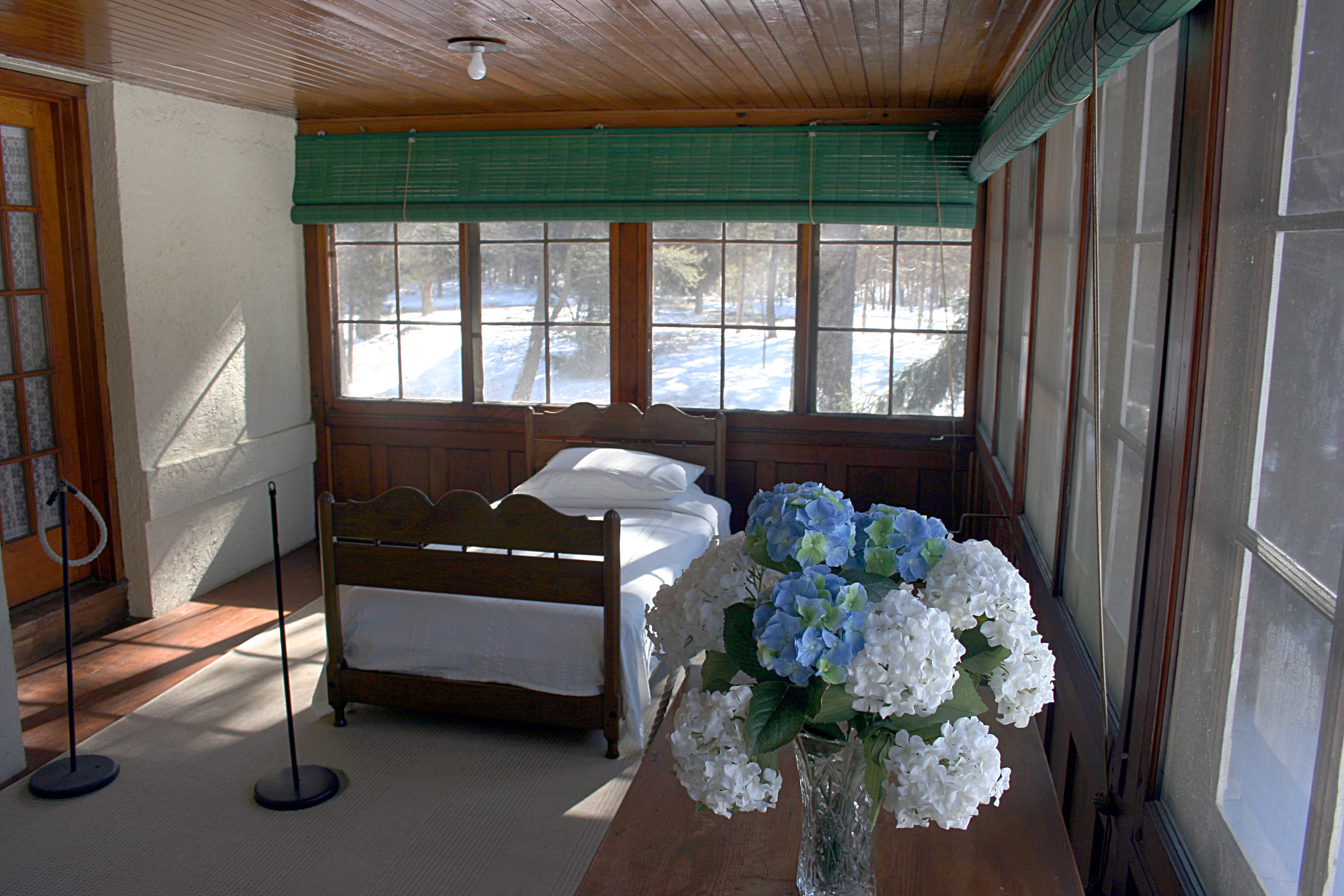
Sleeping porch in the main house of the Eleanor Roosevelt National Historic Site

A sleeping porch is a deck or balcony, sometimes screened or otherwise enclosed with screened windows, and furnished for sleeping in warmer months. They can be on ground level or on a higher storey and on any side of a home. A sleeping porch allows residents to sleep on a screened-in porch, avoiding warm convection currents from air and wall materials beneath or beside. Before affordable electric fans and/or air conditioning were installed, families often created such rooms, well-aired, where children would sleep during summer. The idea gained popularity in the early 1900s and became common in much of the United States.

== Cold rooms in modern communal housing ==
A tradition adapted from the old concept of sleeping porches has survived in communal housing, particularly in sorority and fraternity houses. Often called “cold rooms” or “cold air dorms,” these areas are typically screened or enclosed porches or similar spaces where many members sleep, benefiting from cool evening breezes. In some cases, cold rooms still use design elements similar to early-1900s sleeping porches, such as open screens and maximum airflow.

== See also ==
- Arizona room
- Screened porch
