= Storm window =

Protective secondary window

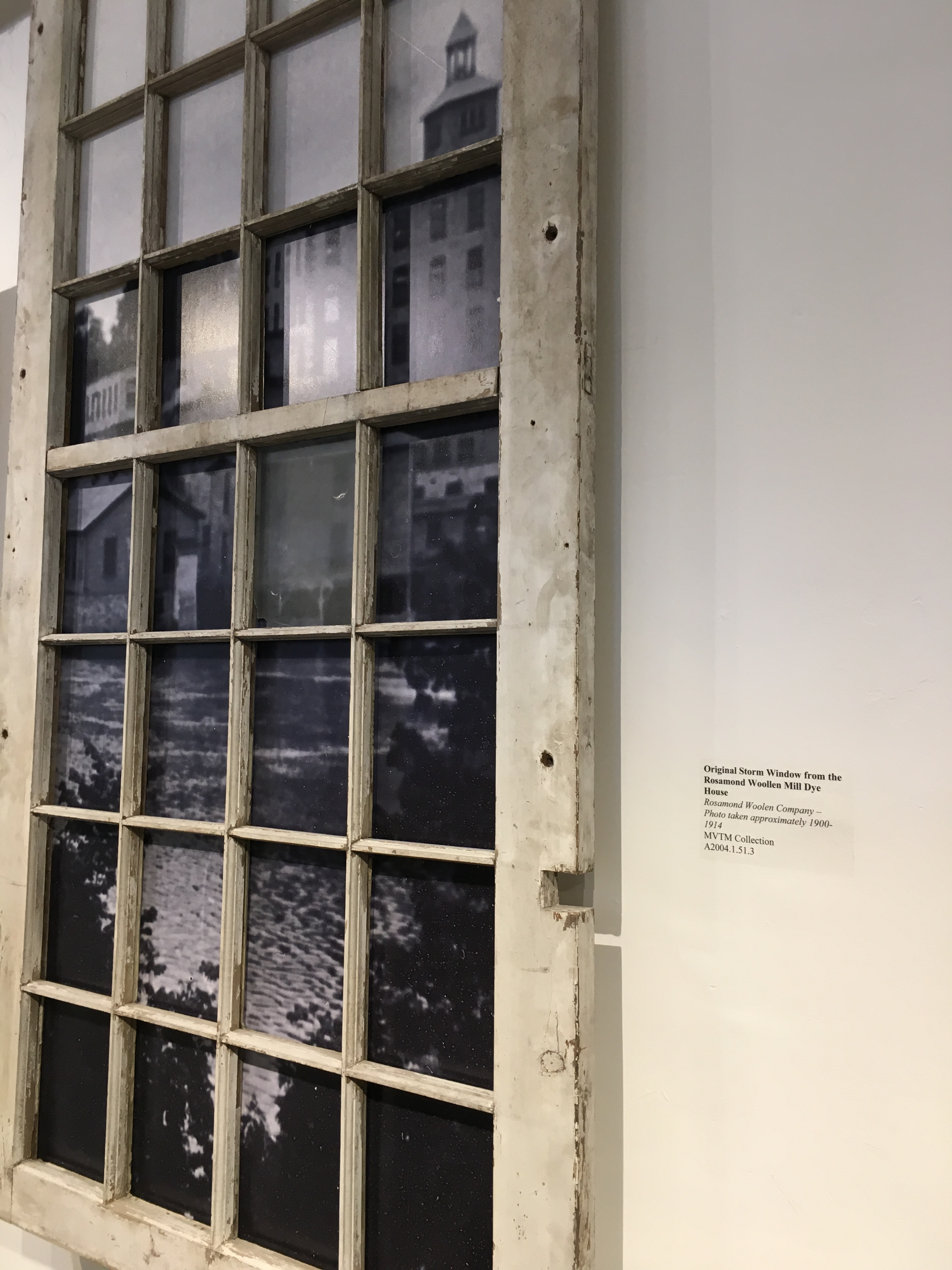
Original storm window from the Rosamond Woollen Mill Dye House, displayed at the Mississippi Valley Textile Museum

Storm windows are windows that are mounted outside or inside of the main glass windows of a building. Storm windows are common on homes in North America, but are uncommon in continental Europe where double, triple or quadruple glazing is prevalent. Storm windows can be made of glass, rigid plastic panels, or flexible plastic sheets; and may be permanently or temporarily mounted. On modern houses they serve on existing windows in order to improve their thermal insulation, functioning similarly to insulated glazing, as well as to provide soundproofing.

Aside from insulation, external storm windows provide an additional measure of protection for homes against damage to costly glass panes during inclement weather such as hail. On older houses, storm windows were installed in autumn when the window screens were removed; later homes had the pieces combined in one unit. Similarly, storm doors (also called "screen doors") allow similar energy savings for the necessarily less efficient primary doors – the screen allows for summer ventilation.

In the United States, the older style of this window is often referred to as a "storm sash". The term may also refer to a small openable flap found in the side window on light aircraft.

== Manufacturing process ==
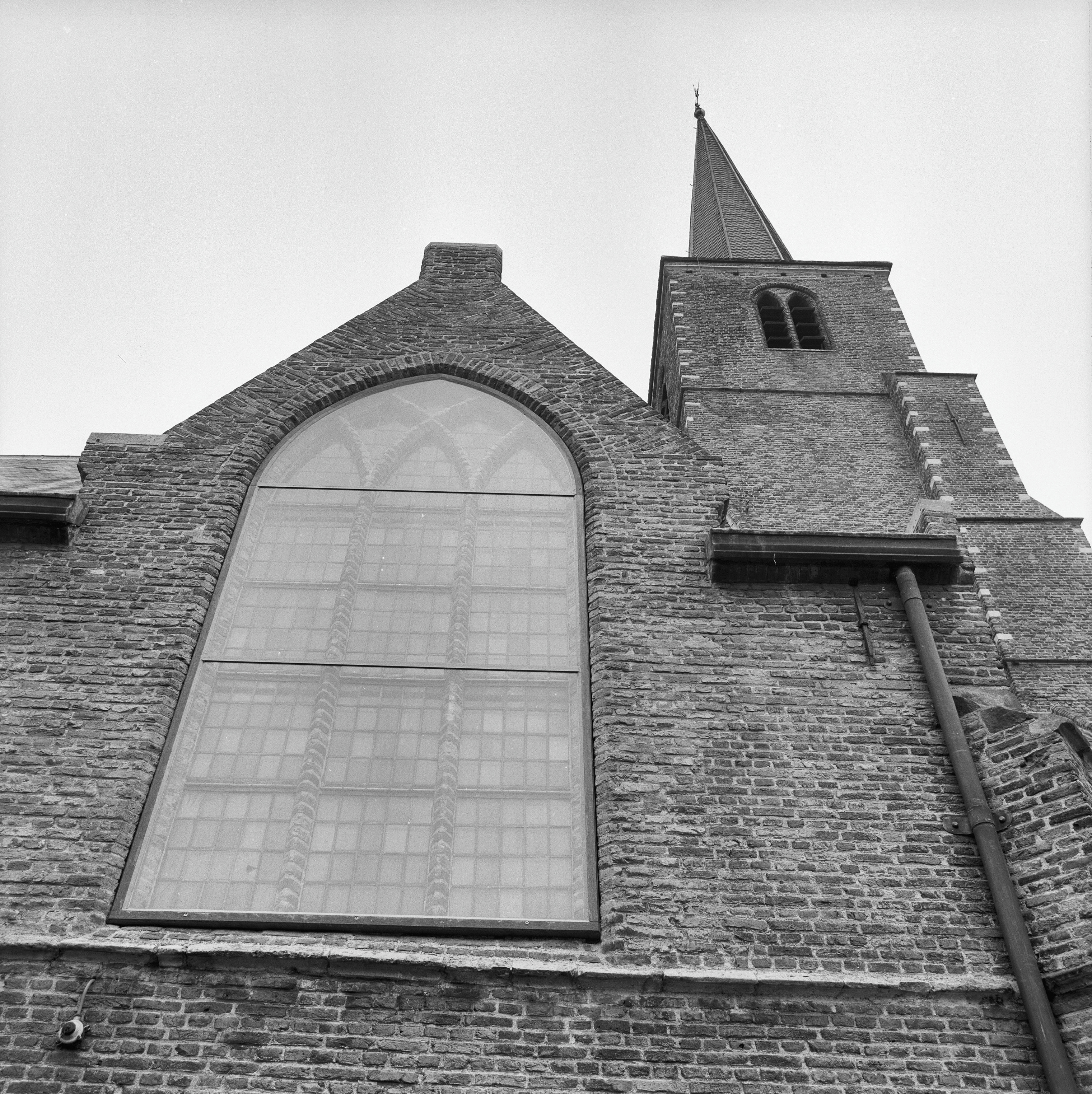
Exterior storm window protecting the Late Gothic church windows of the village church in Poortugaal, Netherlands

There are several laminated glass manufacturing processes:

1. The first method uses two or more pieces of glass bonded between one or more pieces of plasticized polyvinyl butyric resin using heat and pressure.
2. The second method uses two or more pieces of glass and poly-carbonate, bonded together with aliphatic urethane inter-layer under heat and pressure.
3. The third type of laminated glass is interlaid with a cured resin.

Each manufacturing process may include glass layers of equal or unequal thickness.

== Applications ==
Modern storm windows are a typical energy conservation solution for cold climates. They are mostly intended to improve the insulation value (R-value) of existing windows, especially single-glazed units. Storm windows can be very cost effective in cold climates. They are inexpensive, and can reduce heat loss by up to 50%, increasing the building's comfort and reducing the heating costs.

They also reduce exterior air infiltration significantly. Storm windows are an inexpensive add-on: even the best storm windows—three track exterior windows with low thermal emission—will cost a small fraction of the price of standard replacement windows.

Interior storm windows can, however, produce condensation and be visually obstructive; exterior storm windows can also have a negative visual effect. These aesthetic issues can be minimized by single line storm sashes, the incorporation of vent holes, and a properly sealed fit.

== See also ==
- Storm cellar
- Storm door
- Storm drain
- Storm room
- Storm shutter
