= Storm door =

Type of door

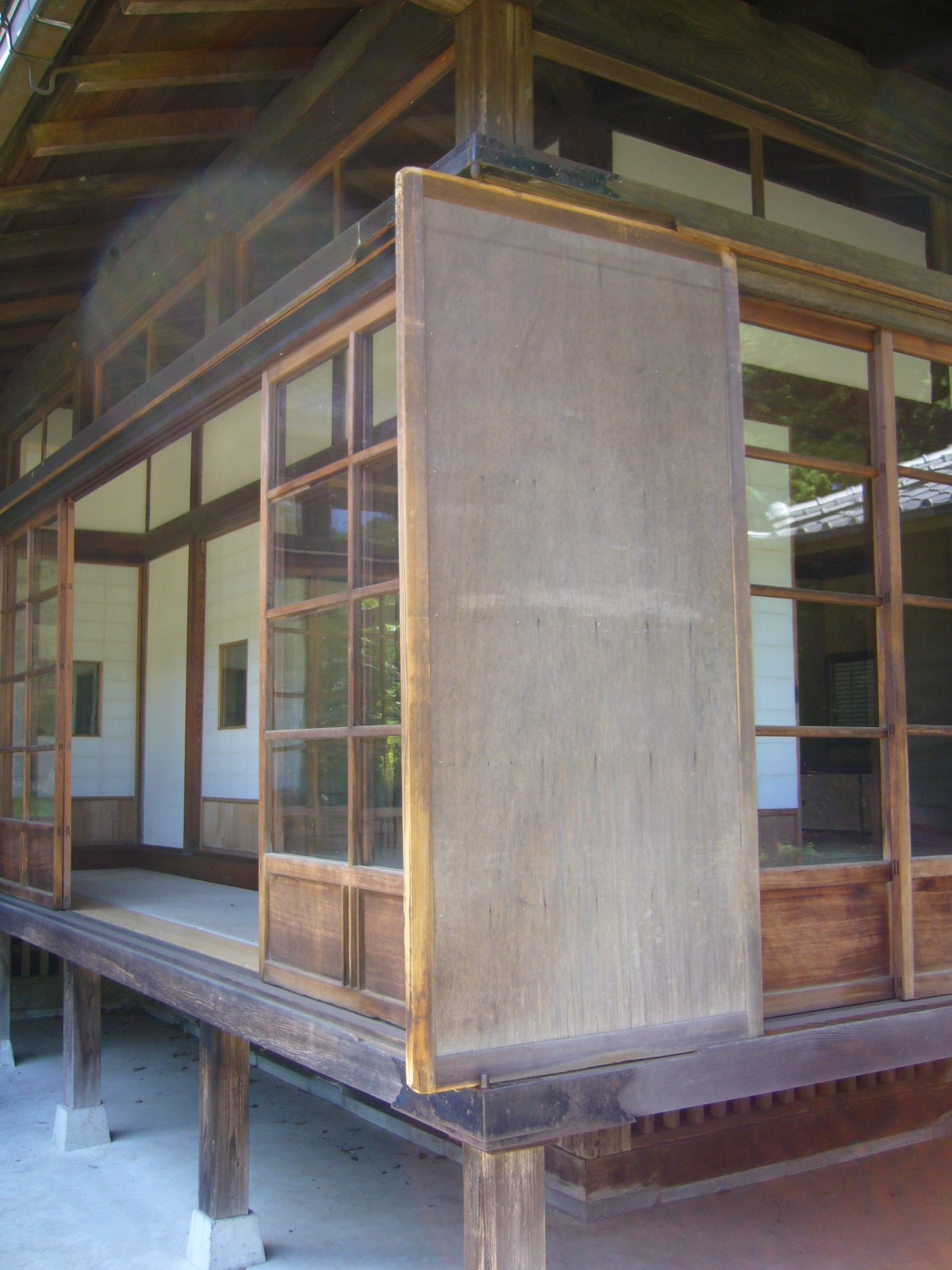
Storm door, Japan

A storm door is a type of door that is installed in front of an exterior access door to protect it from bad weather and allow ventilation. Storm doors generally have interchangeable glass panels and window screen panels to provide visibility and prevent flying insects from entering the home.

== Construction ==
Storm doors are typically made from wood, aluminum and plastics such as vinyl (PVC) and fiberglass. There are three basic types of storm doors: full-view, retractable screen, and ventilating.

Full-view storm doors typically include a full glass panel and most an interchangeable full screen.

Retractable screen storm doors feature a screen that is rolled up into the frame of the storm door when not in use, and can be removed entirely.

=== Wood ===
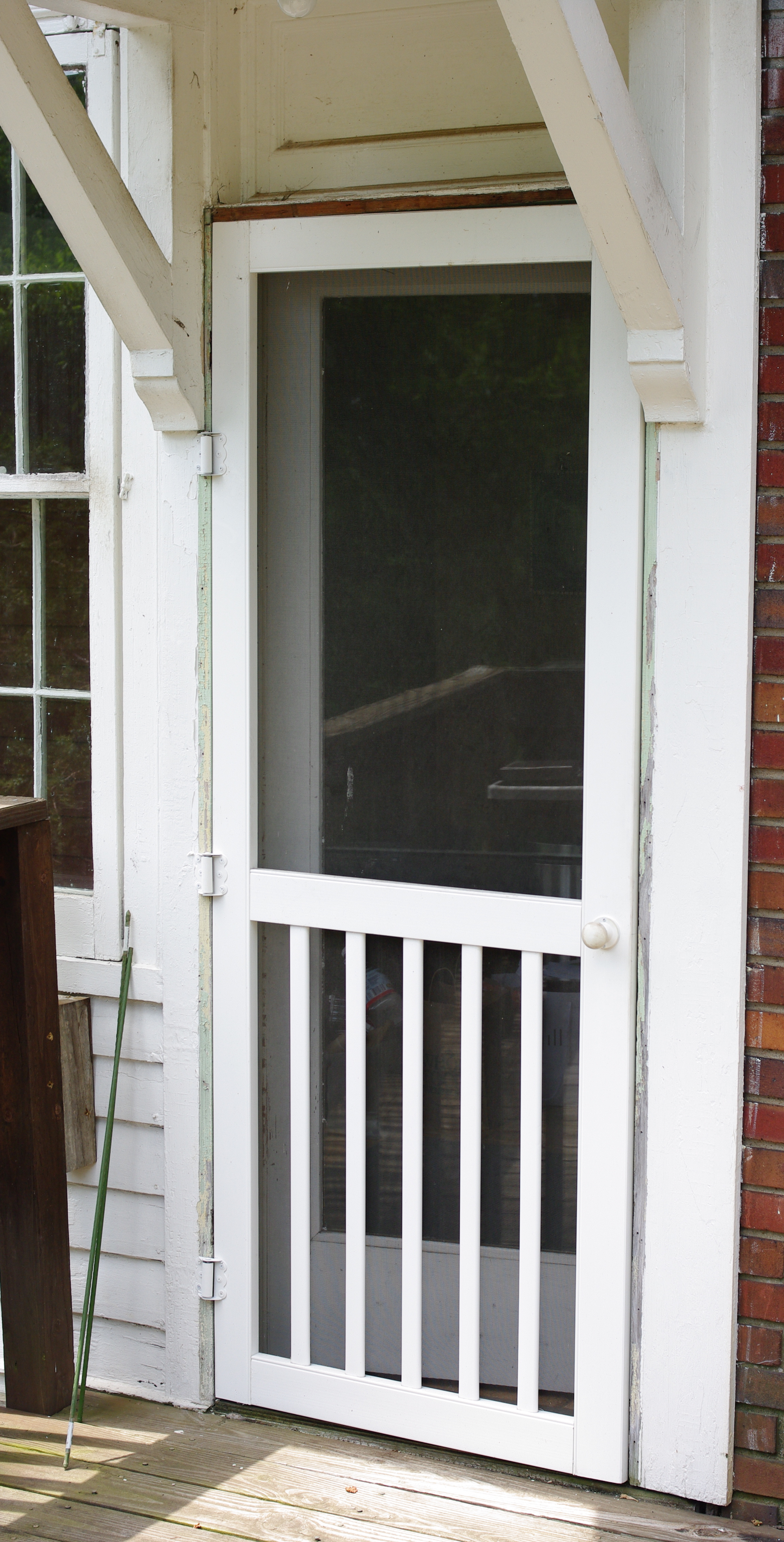
Residential wood and mesh screen door, US

Wood was the original material from which storm doors were made. While wooden screen doors can be visually the most appealing, the wood itself requires painting or some other form of coating to protect it from the weather. Wooden screen doors less than one inch thick are used primarily as screen doors with no glass installed. Using wood thicker than one inch allows the storm door frame to accommodate glass panels. The door also becomes more rigid and durable as the thickness increases.

=== Aluminum ===
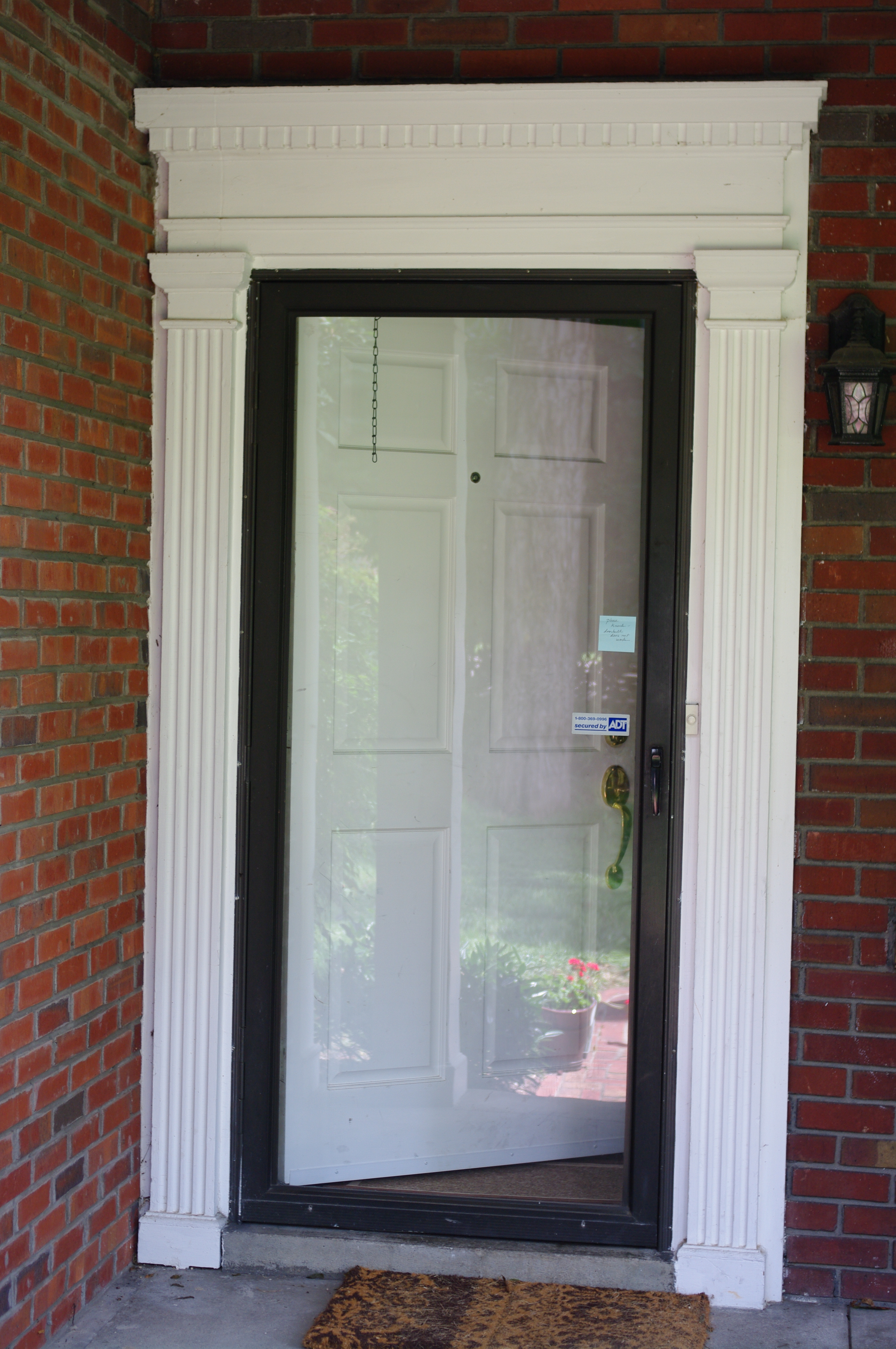
Residential aluminum and glass storm door, US

The main advantage of aluminum over wood as a storm door material is aluminum's resistance to environmental degradation. Aluminum storm doors do not need to be painted frequently to protect them from the elements. Aluminum storm doors are available in a variety of thicknesses. All of these thicknesses can accommodate interchangeable glass and screen panels.

The least expensive storm doors are the thinnest. As the storm door frame gets thicker, the door frame becomes more rigid. The strength and rigidity of the door is limited however, by the relatively brittle aluminum alloy corners that hold the frame together. If the door gets blown open during a storm, the corners can crack and the door will lose its strength. The corners however, can be replaced if parts can be found.

=== PVC and fibreglass ===
Materials such as PVC and fibreglass offer the most corrosion resistance of all when used in a storm door. They can also be moulded in such a way as to realistically mimic wood grain to provide the appearance of a wooden storm door. PVC or "vinyl" storm doors often require internal steel frames to provide the necessary strength to the door. However, extruded PVC doors offer extraordinary strength.

Fibreglass storm door frames are extremely strong, but the material is more expensive. Both PVC and fibreglass storm doors incorporate chemicals to slow the effects of ultraviolet radiation from the sun. UV radiation tends to make plastics become brittle. Again thicker doors have an advantage.

New technology has made extruded PVC doors more durable. This product is not likely to yellow, peel, crack, contract, expand or warp. Since it is made of PVC, this product does not need any painting even if scratched.

PVC doors are welded at the corners, and it is impossible for them to fall apart, separate or go out of square. The welding makes them extremely hard and durable. Because of the welding, there are no screws that will create wear and tear and separation at the corners.

== Types ==
Storm doors come in three different styles:

- Full view. A full view storm door means that there is a full length glass panel that has to be physically changed out if a screen is wanted in it. The unused panel of glass or screen is then stored for future use.
- Ventilating. A ventilating style means that there are two glass panels and 1–2 screen panels in the door at the same time. The glass panel(s) move up or down in order to reveal the screen. This is convenient if cross ventilation in the house is desired without the inconvenience of removing and storing a glass or screen panel.
- Rollscreen. This is a relatively new hybrid of the full view and ventilating storm doors. The screen is connected at the top of the storm door's window, and when not in use it automatically rolls up on a tensioned dowel in the top of the door. This gives a full-view door when the screen is not in use, and a ventilating door when it is.

== Functions ==
Storm doors are designed to provide an extra layer of protection to a front door, shielding it from adverse weather conditions. The storm door serves as a barrier against heavy rain, snow or wind, helping to maintain the structural integrity of the main entrance and minimizing deterioration.

In addition to protection, storm doors provide increased energy efficiency by creating an insulating air pocket between the main door and the exterior wall.

Storm doors increase security by providing a second barrier at the entrance to the home. They can also feature heavy-duty locking systems and reinforced materials, making them difficult to break into.

Many storm door designs also feature interchangeable glass and mesh panels, allowing control of airflow and lighting. In good weather, homeowners can open the main door and use the storm door's mesh panel to let fresh air into the home and repel insects. Conversely, in bad weather, the glass panel serves as an additional barrier without impairing visibility or preventing natural light penetration.

== See also ==
- Screen door
- Storm cellar
- Storm drain
- Storm room
- Storm window
