= Screen door =

Door that lets air pass through

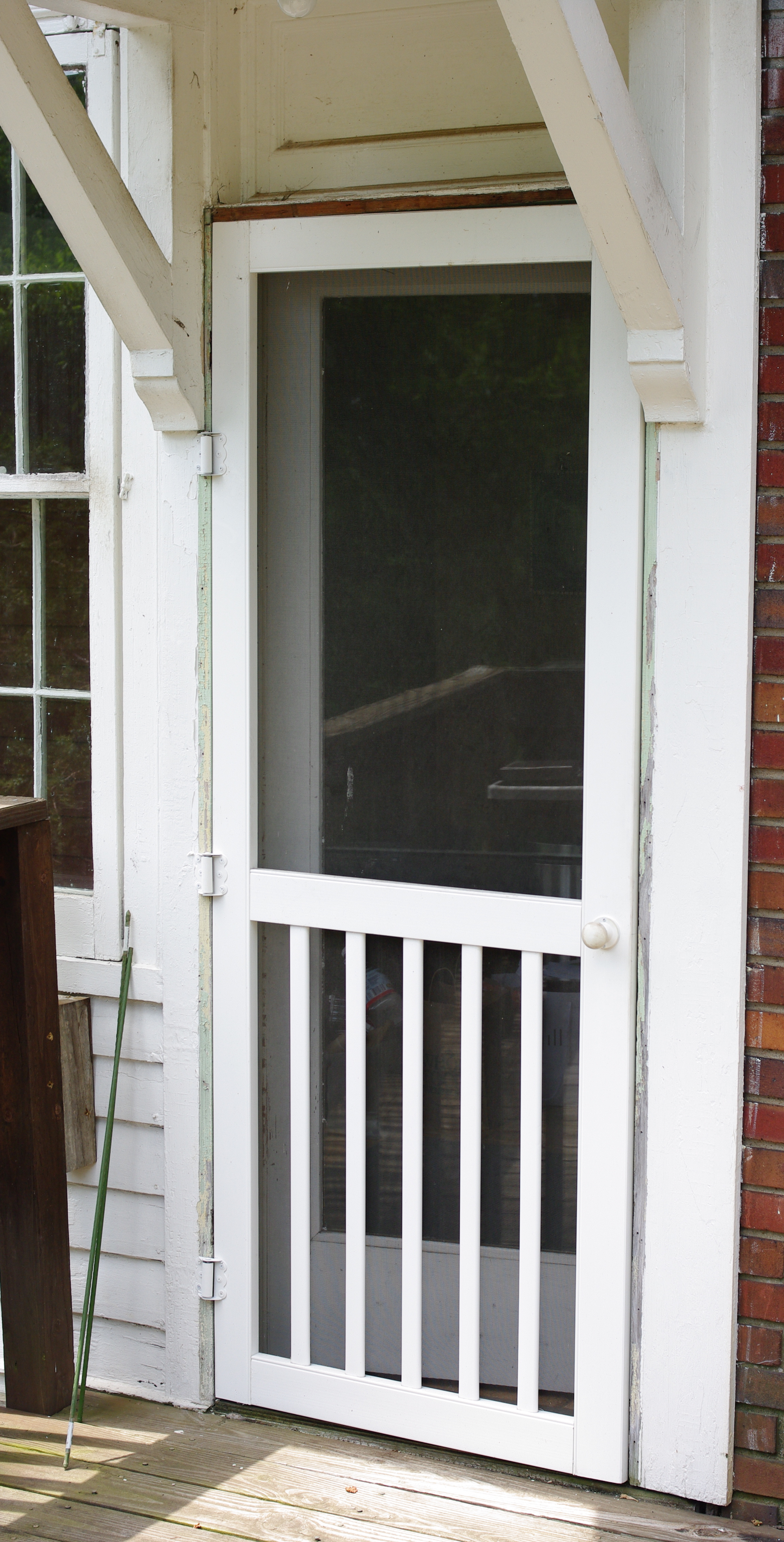
A hinged screen door

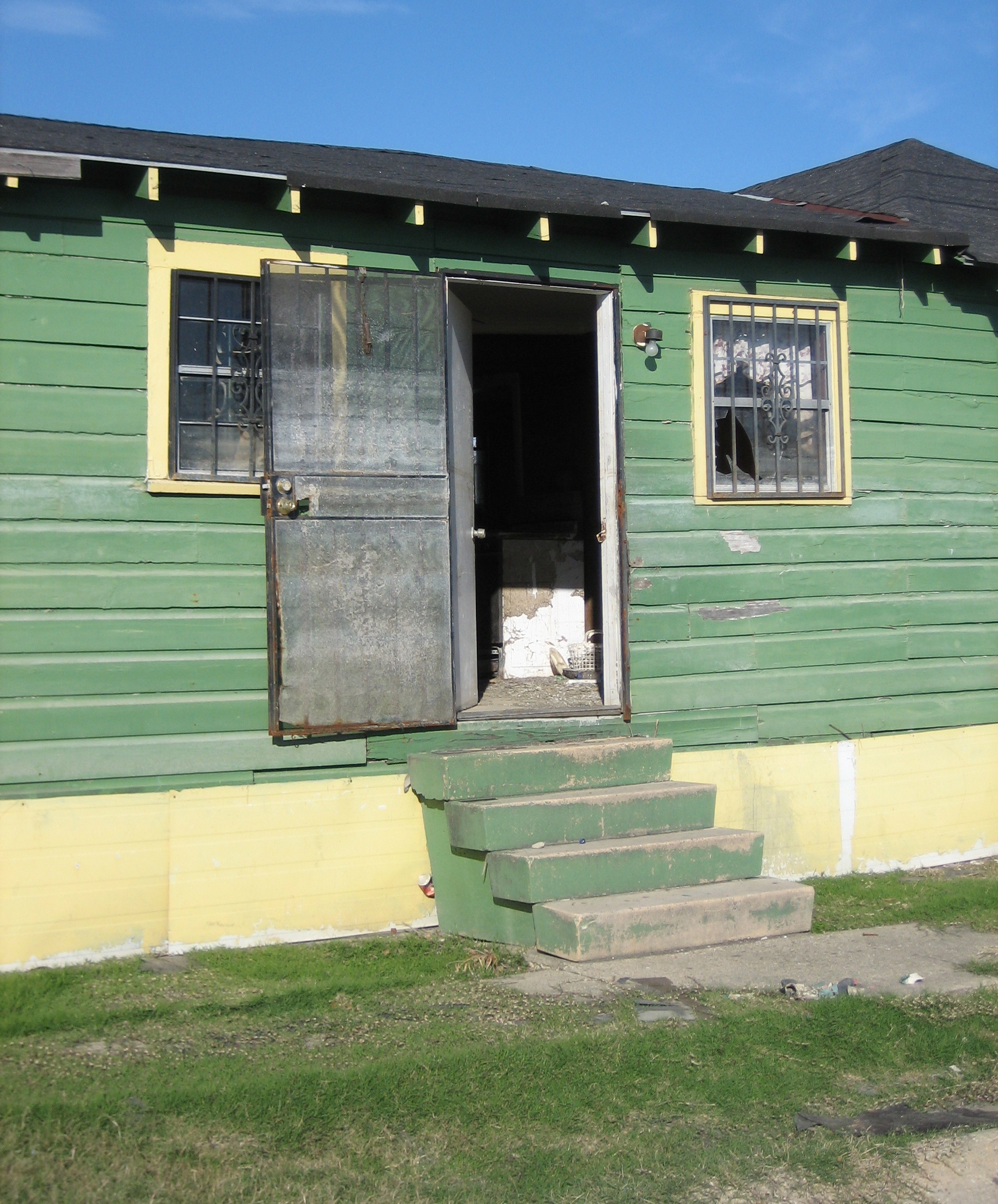
Screen door of a flood-damaged house, in Desire, New Orleans, after Hurricane Katrina, 2006

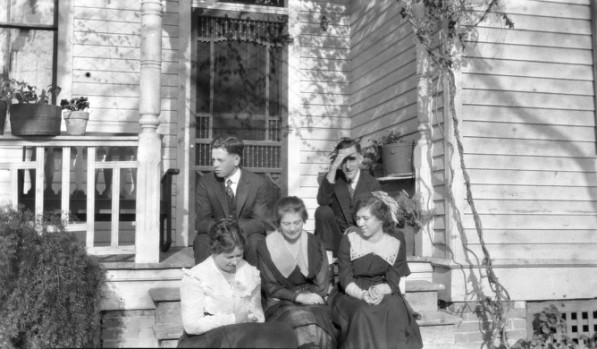
Screen door from early 20th century

A screen door can refer to a hinged storm door (cold climates) or hinged screen door (warm climates) covering an exterior door, or a screened sliding door used with sliding glass doors. A screen door incorporates screen mesh to block birds, flying insects or airborne debris such as seeds or leaves from entering, and pets and small children from exiting interior spaces, while allowing for air, light, and views.

== History ==
The first screen doors were made using cheesecloth. After the American Civil War, wire cloth was coated with paint and sold for window screens.

== Construction ==
=== Aluminium framed ===
Aluminium sliding screen doors are generally constructed by two methods: rollformed or extruded. In both cases the rectangular rollformed or extruded shapes are joined together into a door frame using metal corners or screws.

==== Rollformed ====
The first are rollformed from thin aluminium sheets into a rectangular shaped door frame which incorporates a screen channel to hold the window screen material.

Rollformed aluminum sliding screen doors are the least expensive to produce because they can be manufactured from thin aluminum sheets formed into a relatively strong rectangular shape.

Rollformed screen doors have mitered corners into which a steel or aluminum alloy corner is forced using a friction fit. If a steel corner is used, the rollformed sections are often pierced or staked into the corners, to help secure the corners together. If aluminum alloy corners are used, the corner relies on its friction fit alone to hold the door frame together.

The weakest point of a rollformed sliding screen door is the corner. After repeated opening and closing, stresses will cause the rollformed shape to loosen in the area of the corner. The door will then stick and jam and typically will require replacement rather than repair.

==== Extruded ====
The second are extruded aluminum shapes, with aluminum frames made from thicker aluminum than rollformed doors. This makes an extruded aluminum door much stronger but also more expensive. Extruded aluminum screen door frames can be mitered and joined with aluminum alloy corners or can be notched out and joined together with screws that fit in screw holes made as part of the extrusion process.

Extruded aluminum screen doors are generally longer lasting than rollformed screen doors. They are also more easily repaired since, if the corners break, new corners can be inserted without losing the friction fit necessary to hold the door together.

=== Wood-framed ===
Wood-framed screen doors, hinging and sliding, are also available from limited production and custom carpentry sources, used for aesthetic style and sustainable building applications. Wood-framed screen doors were a fixture of many homes in the American South before air conditioning was common.

== Retractable screen doors ==
An alternative to sliding screen doors is a version of pocket doors, retractable screen doors which 'disappear' out of sight into their own protective housing or casing. These casings can be mounted in several ways. An inside mount is where it can be flush with the door frame. A surface mount can be mounted on the surface of a door frame. Thirdly, one can build a casing inside the wall such that the screen and casing will recess completely out of the way. These screen doors are custom made to fit the necessary dimensions.

Most retractable doors use a spring-loaded roller very similar to a window blind, except the roller is mounted vertically when used in a door application. Screen material is attached to the roller while the opposite side of the material is attached to the sliding bar riding on top and bottom tracks. The bar is moved back and forth to open or close the screen. The bar is usually held closed with a magnetic closure. Different types of mesh fabric options are available from standard fiberglass mesh, pet screen resistant mesh and solar screen mesh. The operation of the screens is typically manual, but motorized versions do exist.

== See also ==
- Platform screen doors
- Window screen
