= Patio =

Outdoor, typically paved, space adjoining a residence or other structure

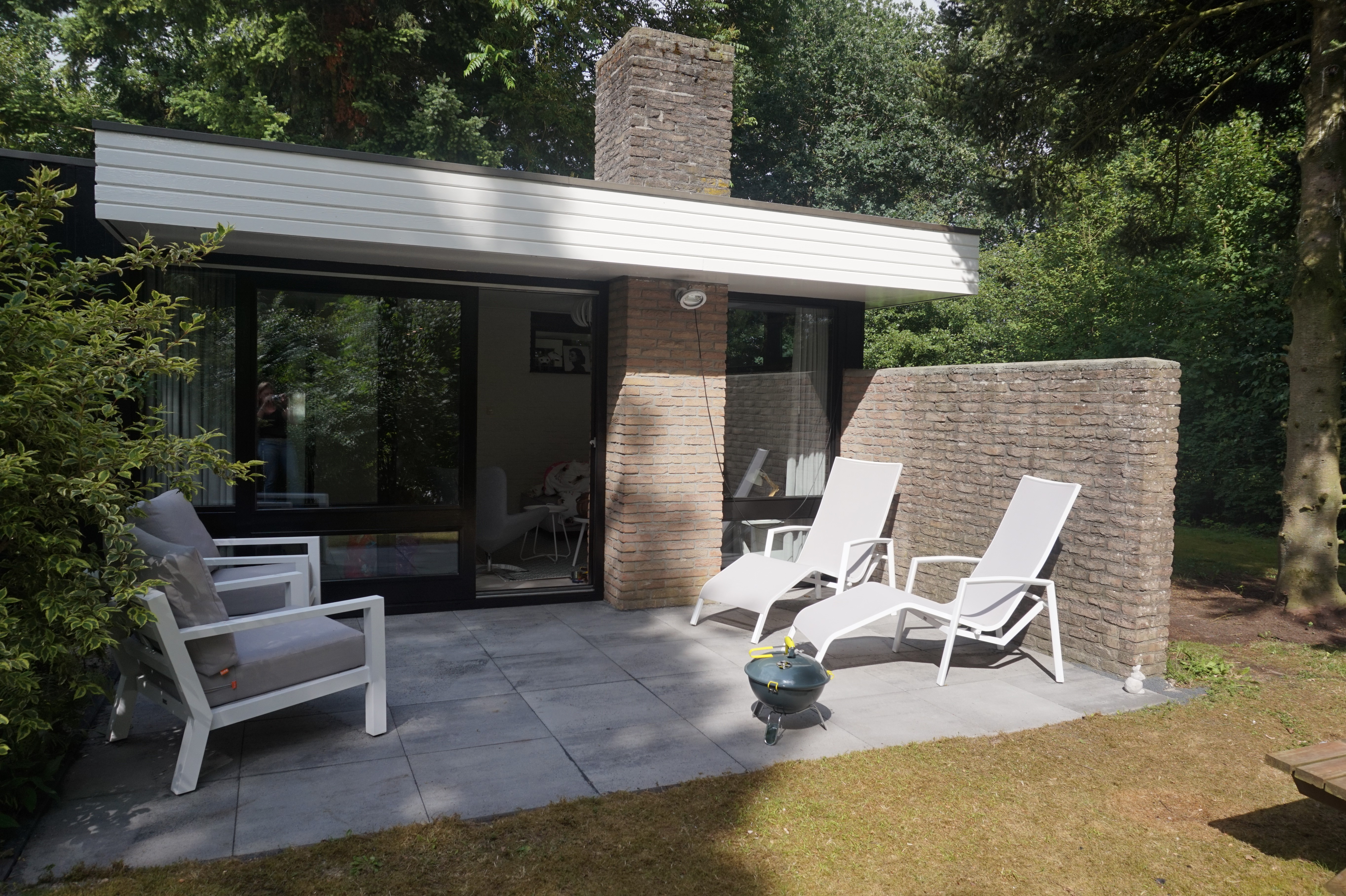
A patio outside of a home in the Netherlands

A patio (Note: English: /ˈpætioʊ/, US also /ˈpɑːtioʊ/; Spanish: [ˈpatjo]) (Spanish for 'courtyard, forecourt, yard, little garden') is an outdoor space generally used for dining or recreation that adjoins a structure and is typically paved. In Australia, the term is expanded to include roofed structures such as a veranda, which provides protection from sun and rain.

== Construction ==
Patios are most commonly paved with concrete or stone slabs (also known as paving flags). They can also be created using bricks, block paving, tiles, cobbles or gravel. Other kinds of patio materials these days include alumawood, aluminum, acrylic and glass. Other options include concrete, stamped concrete, and aggregate concrete.

== Restaurant patio ==
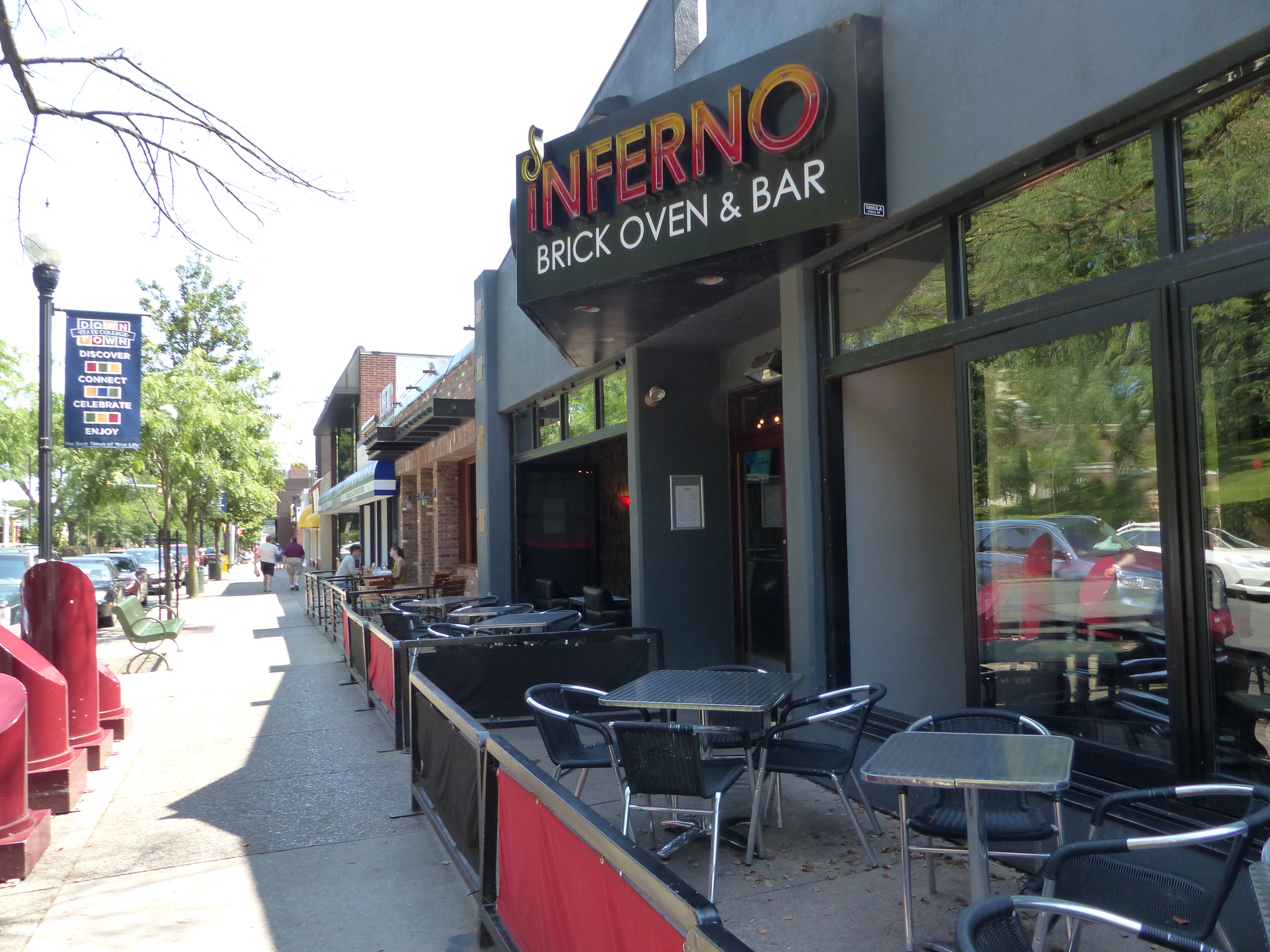
An outdoor seating area at a restaurant in State College, Pennsylvania

Patio is also a general term used for outdoor seating at restaurants, especially in Canadian English. While common in Europe even before 1900, eating outdoors at restaurants in North America was exotic until the 1940s. The Hotel St. Moritz in New York in the 1950s advertised itself as having the first true continental cafe with outdoor seating. The Toronto Star welcomed that city's first patio in the 1960s. In the United States, having a warmer and sunnier climate than Northern Europe, outdoor dining grew rapidly in the 1960s and today is a popular dining experience in the warmer parts of the mainland.

== See also ==
- Andalusian patio
- Arizona room
- Catio
- Deck
- Porch
- Terrace garden
- Veranda
