= Window screen =

Cover for the opening of a window

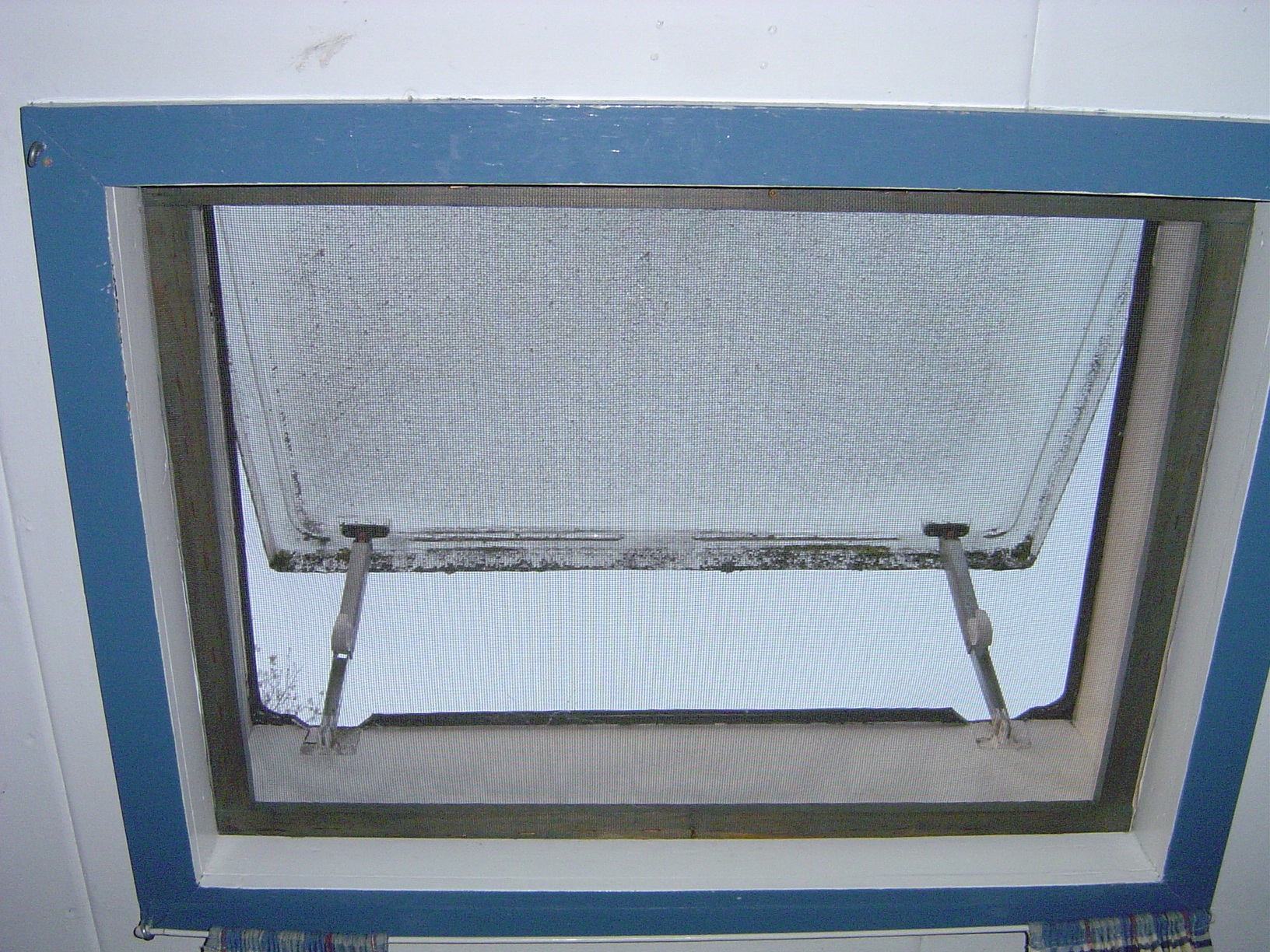
Window with insect screen

A window screen (also known as insect screen, bug screen, fly screen, flywire, window mesh, wire mesh, or window net) is designed to cover the opening of a window. It is usually a mesh made of metal, fibreglass, plastic wire, or other pieces of plastic and stretched in a frame of wood or metal. It serves to keep leaves, debris, bugs, birds, and other animals from entering a building or a screened structure such as a porch, without blocking fresh air-flow.

== History ==
"Wove wire for window screens" are referenced in the American Farmer in 1822.

In 1861 Gilbert, Bennett and Company was manufacturing wire mesh sieves for food processing. An employee realized that the wire cloth could be painted gray and sold as window screens and the product became an immediate success. On July 7, 1868, Bayley and McCluskey filed a U.S. Patent, number 79541 for screened roof-top rail-car windows, allowing ventilation, while preventing "sparks, cinders, dust, etc." from entering the passenger compartment. By 1874, E.T. Barnum Company of Detroit, Michigan advertised screens that were sold by the square foot.

Window screens designed specifically to prevent insect entry were not patented in the United States, although by 1900 several patents were awarded for particular innovations related to window screen design. By the 1950s, malaria was largely eradicated in the United States due to the widespread use of window screens.

== Uses ==
=== Collecting water ===
Screen mesh may collect condensation. This effect has been used to collect water from fog.

=== Decoration ===
Screen painting is a folk art consisting of paintings on window screens.

== Gallery ==
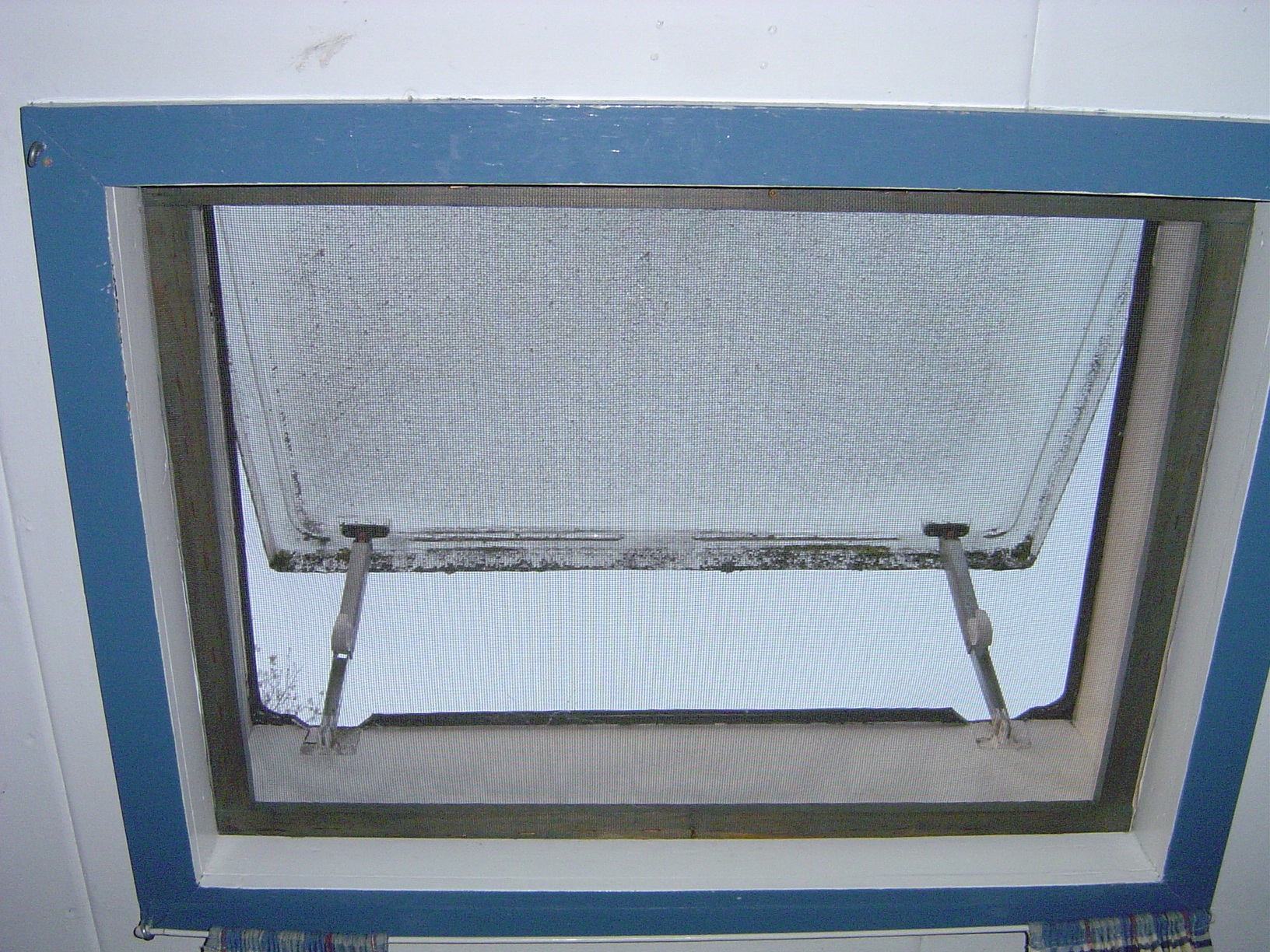
A window with an insect screen

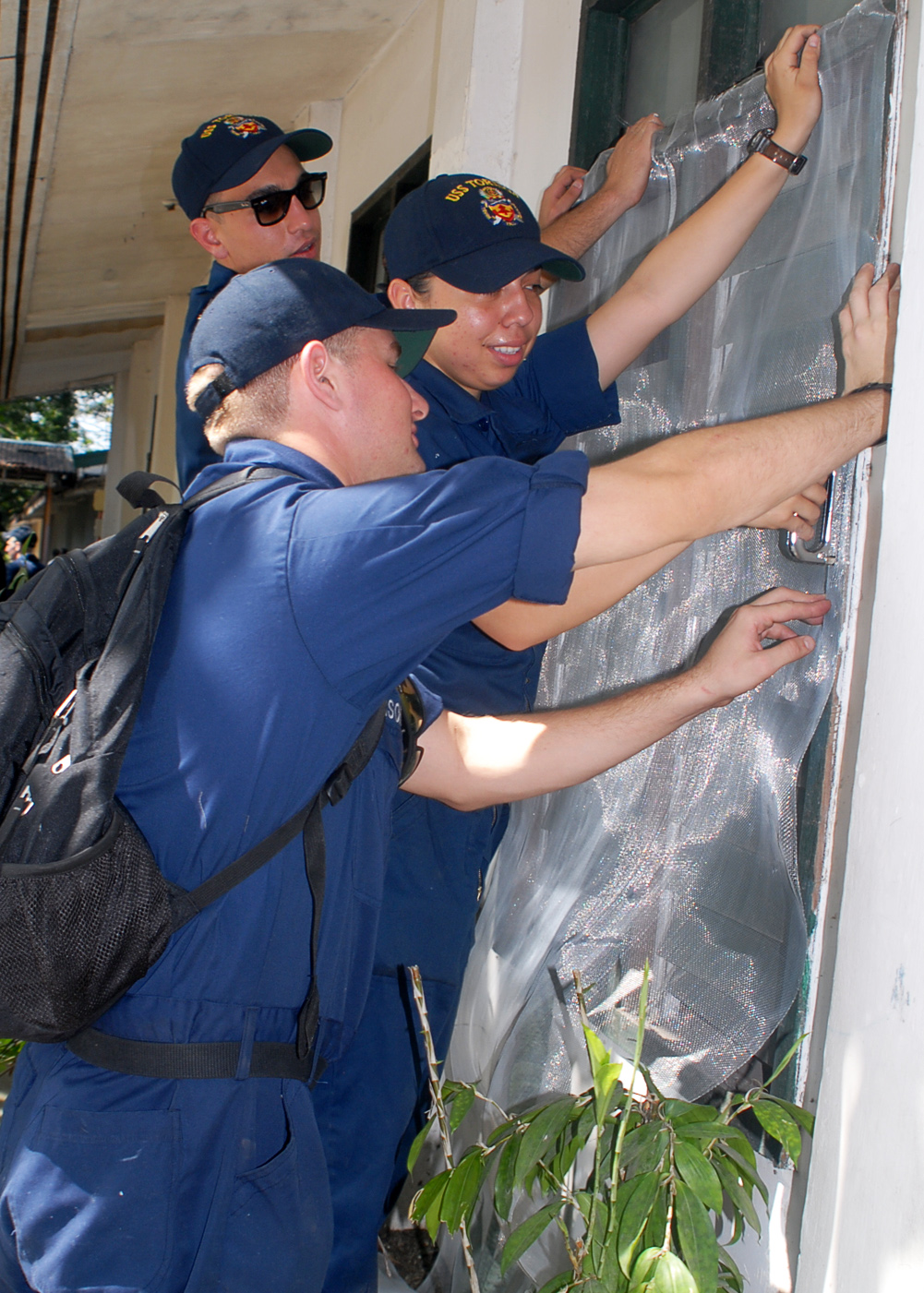
Sailors assigned to the dock landing ship USS Tortuga (LSD 46) replace a protective window screen at Kalalake Elementary School during a community service project

== See also ==
- Mosquito net
- Screen door
