= The Land is Ours =

British land rights campaign

The Land is Ours is a British land rights campaign advocating access to the land, its resources, and the planning processes set up in 1995 by George Monbiot and others.

== History ==
Their first campaign was the occupation of the disused Wisley Airfield in Surrey by 400 people in 1995, from which there was a live broadcast on the BBC's Newsnight programme. Nearby St. George's Hill is symbolically significant as the site of a 1649 protest, when the Diggers planted vegetables on the common land there.

Throughout the summer of 1996, the group set up Pure Genius!!, an eco-village on a derelict former distillery site owned by Guinness in Wandsworth, London. The squatted community was evicted the day before the London Wildlife Trust were meeting to officially designate it as a conservation site containing many species of flowers and birds classed as extremely rare in London.

On 1 April 1999, on the 350th anniversary of Gerrard Winstanley and the Diggers' occupation of the same hill, The Land Is Ours organised a rally, then occupied land at St. George's Hill near Weybridge, Surrey.

In April 2004, The Land Is Ours occupied Castell Henllys, a tourist site with reconstructed Iron Age roundhouses, in protest at Pembrokeshire Coast National Park's decision to demolish That Roundhouse at nearby Brithdir Mawr.

== Influence ==
In 2009, a group inspired by The Land Is Ours opened Kew Bridge Eco Village, a squat on land owned by property developers St George; this was evicted on 27 May 2010.

== The Land Magazine ==
The Land Magazine is published by The Land Is Ours, about landrights, at Monkton Wyld Court, Dorset.

== See also ==
- Commons
- Freedom to roam
- Public land
