= That Roundhouse =

Roundhouse in Newport, Wales

Coordinates: 52.0006°N 4.8076°W

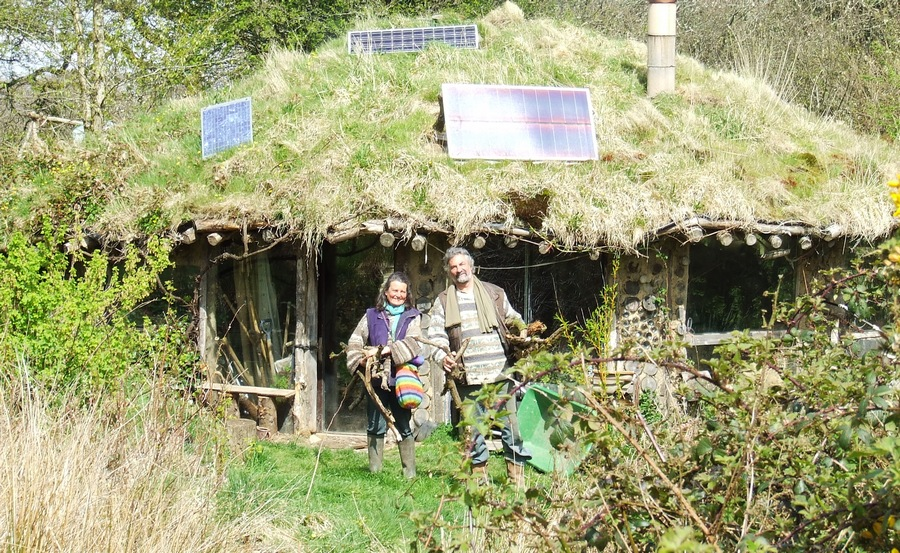
That Roundhouse

That Roundhouse is a roundhouse sited in woods within the Pembrokeshire Coast National Park near the town of Newport in Wales. It was constructed without planning permission during the winter of 1997/1998 by Tony Wrench and Jane Faith and helpers as part of the then secret Brithdir Mawr intentional community. The structure was discovered in 1998, challenged by the authorities, and threatened with demolition; it was granted retrospective planning permission in September 2008, with a review in three years. The “radical experiment” has attracted considerable media attention in relation to issues surrounding green building, affordable housing, low-carbon building, low-impact development and sustainable living.

== Construction ==
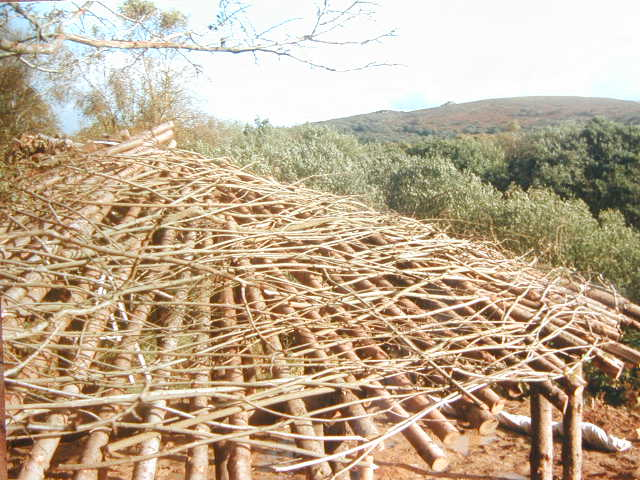
The roundhouse's roof

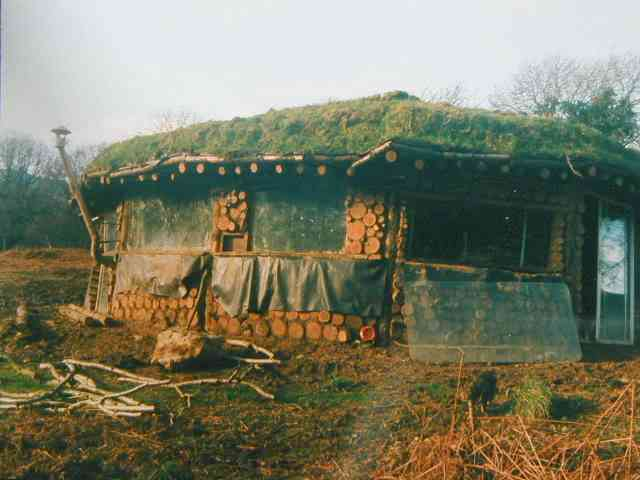
Cordwood wall of the roundhouse

The natural building was designed by Tony Wrench and Jane Faith as their home and was built with the help of friends and volunteers, including labour exchange with their permaculture group. That Roundhouse was built mainly from immediately available materials, which meant primarily wood, all of which they cut themselves (as opposed to using commercially sourced lumber from a sawmill).

Like many roundhouses around the world, it uses a reciprocal frame, in this case, hand-cut Douglas Fir. Between the structural posts are cordwood walls; this technique was common in the pioneer days of North America. The building has a green roof planted with grapes and other productive and native plants, over a pond liner and straw insulation.

The cost of the 10-metre (33 ft) diameter building has been reported at around £3,000. The design is based on permaculture principles of using local resources where possible, to meet one's needs without producing waste and to work with nature rather than against it.

== Legal status ==
Constructed without planning permission during the winter of 1997/1998 as part of the secret Brithdir Mawr project, That Roundhouse was discovered by the authorities from the air in 1998. Wrench applied for planning permission which was turned down and a 10-year legal battle ensued, which included appearances in magistrates' court, the County Court, the Crown Court, fines, threats of injunctions and a public inquiry. At one point they announced that they were going to comply with the court and 'deconstruct' the building, however on the day the deconstruction was due to start a well-organised protest was arranged by supporters who threatened to squat the roundhouse to delay its destruction further. During this whole process the National Park was also developing a new more sympathetic policy towards Low Impact development to which Wrenches were providing evidence. Every move in the process led to renewed interest from the media who were generally more sympathetic with the Wrenches than with the authority especially where the chair of the planning authority received planning permission for a large new building within sight of a land around the roundhouse. In the end the enforcement of the court's original decision was delayed long enough for the park guidance to be approved and finally for the roundhouse to be given planning approval.

=== Phase 1: Courts, appeals, fines and summons ===
Their appeal against the rejection of planning permission led to a three-day public inquiry which upheld the original decision with the inspector reporting that the building was "seriously out of keeping with the general character of buildings in the National Park" and that the appellants "had failed to establish a functional need for this dwelling to serve the agricultural and forestry enterprises". The inspector did however grant the couple personal temporary permission to remain in the building for a further 18 months on compassionate grounds. An enforcement notice was issued at the end of the period of the 18-month temporary permission and in October 2003 they received a summons to appear at Haverfordwest Magistrates Court where they were fined £300. By chance, on the following day they were providing evidence to the public inquiry into the new policy of low-impact development being developed by Pembrokeshire Council and the Pembrokeshire Coast National Park. Lawyers acting for the Wrenches appealed against the authority's decision but it was rejected.

=== Phase 2: The decision to demolish, protest, more court cases ===
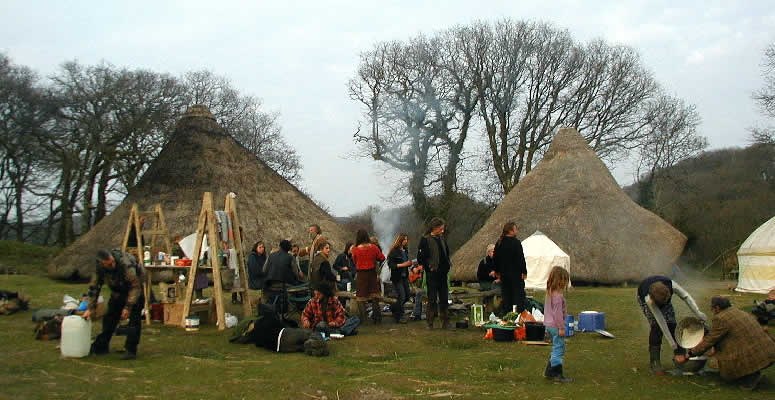
Squat at Castell Henllys

They received a further Enforcement notice a month later and announced their intention to comply with the order and invited people to a "deconstruction camp" to take place between 9 and 17 April which resulted in not only people arriving to take the building down by also intense media interest and a protest organised by supporters of their cause. The Land is Ours, a land rights campaign, simultaneously 'squatted' their house so they would have to evict them before they could demolish it; and also squatted the roundhouses at Castell Henllys, a visitor attraction and example of reconstruction archaeology built by the park; and protested on the A487 road. The protest then moved to the offices of the parks authority in Haverfordwest. Meanwhile, a survey by BBC's Countryfile reported that 29,500 people supported the roundhouse, whereas only 2,500 were in favour of its demolition.

A further summons to appear at Magistrates' Court in Haverfordwest followed where the magistrates decided to refer the case to the Crown Court in Swansea to be sentenced. The judge fined them £800 commenting that "he thought the reasons for building the roundhouse were highly commendable but that planning regulations were necessary for the functioning of society". The parks planning Committee then announced that it would start proceedings in the County Court to request an injunction forcing them to demolish the roundhouse and they were summonsed to Carmarthen County Court April 26, 2005 for a Case Management Conference which was then adjourned until June 2005. Two weeks before the second case conference the national park announced that it would suspend all legal activity until May 2006 when the new planning guidance was to be published by the authority.

=== Phase 3: New policies, failure and then success ===
In August 2004 the UK Government published Planning Policy Statement 7: Sustainable Development in Rural Areas. When the new Parks guidance for Low Impact Development became available the Park's authority reviewed the case and again ordered that the dwelling should be demolished. After various deferrals and a joint application with the neighbouring Tir Ysbrydol community who had constructed similar buildings they were given the building temporary planning approval with a review after three years by 9 votes to 2 in September 2008. A spokeswoman for the park said, "It was pleasing that support could be given at this stage for this longstanding, complicated case".

== See also ==
- Low-impact development (UK)
