= Tinker's Bubble =

Coordinates: 50°56′N 2°44′W

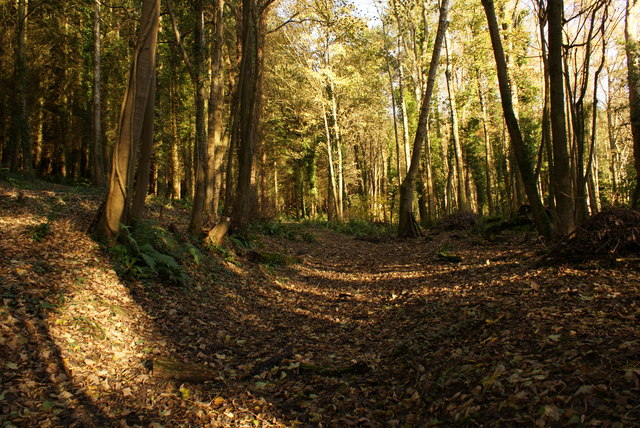
Norton Covert site of Tinker's Bubble

Tinker's Bubble is an intentional community located at Norton Covert in Little Norton near Yeovil in south Somerset, England. It was established in 1994 on 40 acres (160,000 m^{2}) of land consisting of about 20 acres (81,000 m^{2}) of woodland as well as orchards and pasture.

The woods are mostly Douglas fir and larch but with patches of native species such as ash trees. Much of the pasture is maintained traditionally using scythes for hay making. Tinker's Bubble earns a small income by selling organically grown produce at local farmers' markets and selling sustainably produced timber which is felled by hand, logged by horse and sawn by a wood-fired steam-engine driven sawmill. The community has a ban on the use of fossil fuels on site (with the exception of lighting such as paraffin lamps) and use solar powered 12v electricity.

The buildings are temporary structures built with a very low environmental impact when compared to conventional housing. The community fought very hard for planning consent for dwellings on the site and now has permission for temporary dwellings with limitations such as to the number of vehicles owned by the community.

The community are WWOOF hosts and accept working visits from WWOOF members as a chance to experience their way of life.

Nine‑year‑old Eve, from the community, features in a short documentary depicting her daily life, her school experiences, and a speech she made at an environmental rally in London.

== See also ==
- Diggers and Dreamers
