= Lammas Ecovillage =

Off-grid village in Pembrokeshire, Wales

Coordinates: 51.93013°N 4.62979°W

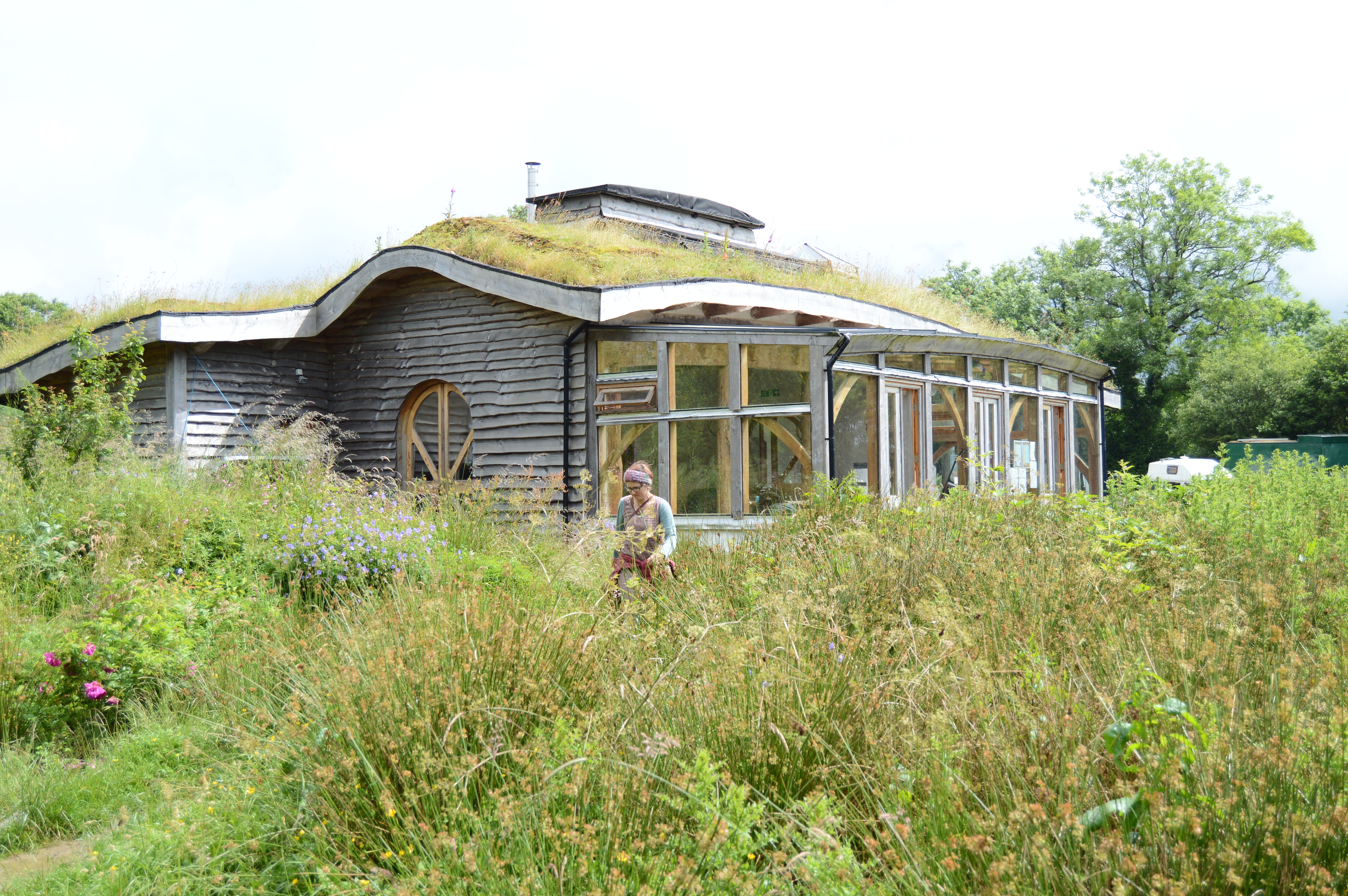
- The hub building at Lammas

- Location within Pembrokeshire
- Principal area: Pembrokeshire
- Country: Wales
- Sovereign state: United Kingdom
- Post town: Whitland
- Postcode district: SA34
- Dialling code: 01239
- Police: Dyfed-Powys
- Fire: Mid and West Wales
- Ambulance: Welsh
- UK Parliament: Preseli Pembrokeshire
- Senedd Cymru – Welsh Parliament: Preseli Pembrokeshire

Lammas Ecovillage (Welsh: Tir-y-Gafel) is a low-impact, off-grid ecovillage in Glandwr, near Crymych in Pembrokeshire, West Wales, comprising nine households and a community hub on a 76 acres (31 ha) site. Buildings are constructed of natural materials and energy obtained from renewable sources. Planning permission took some years to obtain, but has established a replicable template for similar future developments in Wales.

== Development ==
The project was the first ecovillage in the UK to attain prospective planning permission, and this was achieved in 2009 after a three-year planning campaign culminating in a public hearing. The project had applied under an innovative local planning policy designed to support low-impact development. The policy required residents to live a sustainable lifestyle and substantially support themselves from land-based livelihood.

== Concept ==
The ecovillage is centered on a Community Hub, from which courses, conferences and open days are run. It was constructed using local timber, straw bale insulation and locally sourced aggregate as well as incorporating various green technologies (such as a masonry stove, passive solar heating and a wood-fired kitchen). Funding for the Community Hub came from the Department of Energy and Climate Change.

The project has been designed as a replicable template - with each household purchasing a 1000-year agricultural lease from the organisation which provides them with autonomy and security. Each household has access to approximately 7 acres (2.8 ha) of land from which they derive food, fuel and income. One resident utilises permaculture techniques for managing the land, and electricity is generated by solar panels and a micro hydro turbine.

The nine smallholdings demonstrate a range of natural building techniques though there have been challenges over compliance with building regulations which led to some of the residents being taken to court by Pembrokeshire County Council. These issues have since been resolved.

The site is listed by RCAHMW and featured on Channel 4's Grand Designs, Series 17, Episode 6 in 2016.

== Post-establishment ==
Since Lammas, the Welsh Government introduced a national low-impact policy, "One Planet Development", which creates a framework for land-based smallholdings and ecovillage projects to be established in Wales.

One house, built at a cost of £27,000 over several years, was destroyed by fire in January 2018, with a total re-build estimate of £500,000. The house was not insured as construction had not been completed.

== See also ==
- Diggers and Dreamers
- Low-impact development (UK)
