= Low-impact development =

Low-impact development may refer to:

- Low-impact development (U.S. and Canada), the term used in Canada and the US to describe planning and engineering design approach to managing stormwater runoff
- Low-impact development (UK), the term used in the UK for developments with little or no environmental impact
