= Knockshannoch Lodge =

Building in Scotland

- Interactive map of the Knockshannoch Lodge area

General information
- Location: Kirkton of Glenisla, Angus, Scotland
- Coordinates: 56.72265894°N 3.25433314°W
- Completed: c. 1888 (138 years ago)
- Owner: Jim and Susan Muir

Design and construction
- Architect: William Starkey

Knockshannoch Lodge is a Category B listed building in the Scottish village of Glenisla, Angus, built around 1888. It is a small, single-storey cottage, notable for its circular form. The main house consists of two circular buildings, made to look separate but connected by a short corridor. One or both buildings formerly had a thatched roof. The ceilings in both buildings are vaulted but have had false ceilings installed to improve heating efficiency.

The building's architect was engineer William Starkey, who later became a soldier and was killed on the Western Front in 1914.

The building was a youth hostel in the first half of the 20th century, and it has also been a convalescent home, accommodation for forestry workers and an outdoor pursuits centre.

Originally part of 17,000 acres (6,900 ha), much of the land was sold to the Forestry Commission.

== Old Generator Cottage ==
A few yards away stands the Old Generator Cottage. Another roundhouse, also Category B listed, this one much smaller and, as of 2021, derelict. It had planning permission in place to be converted into a home for use as a holiday let or guest accommodation.

The properties were put on the market in 2021 with an asking price of £535,000.

== See also ==
- List of listed buildings in Glenisla, Angus
