= List of listed buildings in Glenisla, Angus =

This is a list of listed buildings in the parish of Glenisla in Angus, Scotland.

== List ==
Name	Location	Date Listed	Grid Ref. (Note: Sometimes known as OSGB36, the grid reference (where provided) is based on the British national grid reference system used by the Ordnance Survey. • "Guide to National Grid". Ordnance Survey. • "Get-a-map". Ordnance Survey.)	Geo-coordinates	Notes	LB Number (Note: Historic Environment Scotland assign a unique alphanumeric identifier to each designated site in Scotland, for listed buildings this always begins with "LB", for example "LB12345".)	Image
Forter Bridge Over Balloch Burn				56°46′07″N 3°19′54″W	Category C(S)	11338	Upload another image See more images
Balloch Bridge Over Ballochburn				56°45′58″N 3°21′42″W	Category C(S)	11339	Upload Photo
Kilry Church				56°40′10″N 3°13′58″W	Category C(S)	11344	Upload another image See more images
Kirkyard Walls				56°43′44″N 3°17′05″W	Category B	11365	Upload Photo
Kirkside (Formerly Glenisla Manse)				56°43′46″N 3°17′01″W	Category C(S)	11366	Upload Photo
Knockshannoch - Coach House And Stables With Adjacent Pig Sty				56°43′27″N 3°15′19″W	Category B	11370	Upload Photo
Whitchills - Limekiln				56°43′18″N 3°15′44″W	Category B	11331	Upload Photo
Forter Castle				56°45′58″N 3°20′21″W	Category B	11337	Upload another image
Old Farmhouse, Little Kilry				56°40′58″N 3°15′48″W	Category B	11343	Upload Photo
Knock Shannoch Youth Hostel				56°43′22″N 3°15′16″W	Category B	11368	Upload Photo
Craig - Old Burial Enclosure				56°39′32″N 3°13′27″W	Category B	11345	Upload Photo
Knockshannoch - Old Generator House				56°43′24″N 3°15′15″W	Category B	11369	Upload Photo
Old Bridge Of Brenlands Over River Isla. (By-Passed - Restored By Eric Feany)				56°44′15″N 3°18′59″W	Category B	11333	Upload another image
West Mill - Old Farmhouse				56°43′43″N 3°16′23″W	Category C(S)	11334	Upload Photo
Folda School Now Guards House				56°45′54″N 3°19′49″W	Category C(S)	11335	Upload Photo
Knockshannoch Lodge				56°43′18″N 3°15′15″W	Category B	12384	Upload Photo
Birkhill Farmhouse				56°43′23″N 3°18′00″W	Category C(S)	11332	Upload Photo
Presnerb Farmhouse				56°47′08″N 3°19′56″W	Category C(S)	11340	Upload Photo
Crandart Farmhouse				56°47′33″N 3°19′47″W	Category C(S)	11341	Upload Photo
Glenisla School Bridge Over River Isla				56°43′40″N 3°17′17″W	Category B	11367	Upload Photo
Knockshannoch - Kennels				56°43′26″N 3°15′19″W	Category B	11330	Upload Photo
Bridge Of Forter Over River Isla				56°46′07″N 3°19′54″W	Category B	11336	Upload Photo
Bridge Of Craigisla Over River Isla				56°40′12″N 3°13′21″W	Category C(S)	13747	Upload another image See more images
Old School-House, Kilry				56°40′52″N 3°15′19″W	Category B	11342	Upload Photo
Glenisla Parish Kirk				56°43′45″N 3°17′05″W	Category B	11364	Upload another image

== Key ==
The scheme for classifying buildings in Scotland is:

- Category A: "buildings of national or international importance, either architectural or historic; or fine, little-altered examples of some particular period, style or building type."
- Category B: "buildings of regional or more than local importance; or major examples of some particular period, style or building type, which may have been altered."
- Category C: "buildings of local importance; lesser examples of any period, style, or building type, as originally constructed or moderately altered; and simple traditional buildings which group well with other listed buildings."

In March 2016 there were 47,288 listed buildings in Scotland. Of these, 8% were Category A, and 50% were Category B, with the remaining 42% being Category C.

== See also ==
- List of listed buildings in Angus
