= Cae Mabon =

Retreat centre in North Wales

Coordinates: 53.13122°N 4.1276°W

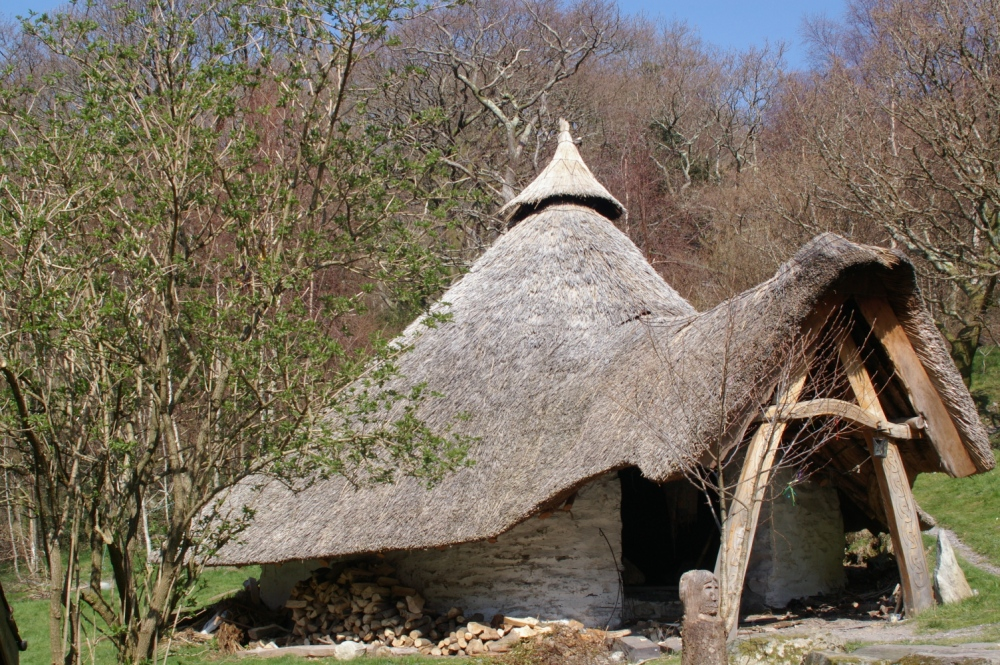
The roundhouse at Cae Mabon – exterior view

Cae Mabon is a retreat centre in North Wales, set in an oak forest close to the disused Dinorwic Quarry and on the opposite side of the Padarn lake from the town of Llanberis.

The centre has been run by its founder, local storyteller, author, and songwriter Eric Maddern, since 1989 and is well regarded for the beauty of its natural setting as well as the architecture of its alternative, low-impact buildings.

In 2008, Cae Mabon was placed as the number one natural building project in the United Kingdom in the top ten list compiled by Professor Tom Woolley for sustain magazine. In the same year, the local authority granted retrospective planning permission on all the centre's alternatively constructed buildings, after support was shown for Cae Mabon by prominent local figures, including Dafydd Iwan.

The name Cae Mabon means 'Field of Mabon' in Welsh, referring to Mabon ap Modron, a character from the Mabinogion.
