= Low-impact development (UK) =

Developments with little or no environmental impact

Low-impact development (LID) has been defined as "development which through its low negative environmental impact either enhances or does not significantly diminish environmental quality".

The interplay between would-be developers and the UK planning authorities since the 1980s has led to a diversity of unique, locally adapted developments, often making use of natural, local and reclaimed materials in delivering highly affordable, low or zero carbon housing. These LIDs often strive to be self-sufficient in terms of waste management, energy, water and other needs.

There are numerous examples of LIDs throughout the UK, and local and national authorities have come to recognise the need for the concept to be incorporated into planning strategies.

== Definition ==
Low-impact development (LID), in the UK sense of the term, was described by Simon Fairlie, a former editor of The Ecologist magazine, in 1996 as: "development that through its low impact either enhances or does not significantly diminish environmental quality." Fairlie later wrote:

"Neither the term nor the concept was new. People have been living low impact lifestyles in low impact buildings for centuries; indeed until very recently the majority of people in the world lived that way."

In 2009 Fairlie revised his definition of a LID as: "development which, by virtue of its low or benign environmental impact, may be allowed in locations where conventional development is not permitted." He explained:

"I prefer this revised definition because wrapped up in it is the main argument; that low impact buildings need not be bound by the restrictions necessary to protect the countryside from 'conventional' high impact development – a.k.a. suburban sprawl. There are two other principle arguments in favour of LID: (i) that some form of exception policy is necessary because conventional housing in a countryside protected from sprawl becomes too expensive for the people who work there; and (ii) soon we will all have to live more sustainable low impact lifestyles, so pioneers should be encouraged."

Others have expanded on the definition. A study by the University of West England acknowledged that: "LID is usually integrally connected with land management and as much as describing physical development, LID also describes a form of livelihood." However, it also states that as LID is a "multi featured and intrinsically integrated form of development," a simple definition cannot capture the meaning of LID and goes on to develop "a detailed themed definition with detailed criteria."

Dr Larch Maxey in 2013 held the main features of LID to be:

- locally adapted, diverse and unique
- based on renewable resources
- of an appropriate scale
- visually unobtrusive
- enhances biodiversity
- increases public access to open space
- generates little traffic
- linked to sustainable livelihoods
- co-ordinated by a management plan

== Examples ==
=== England ===
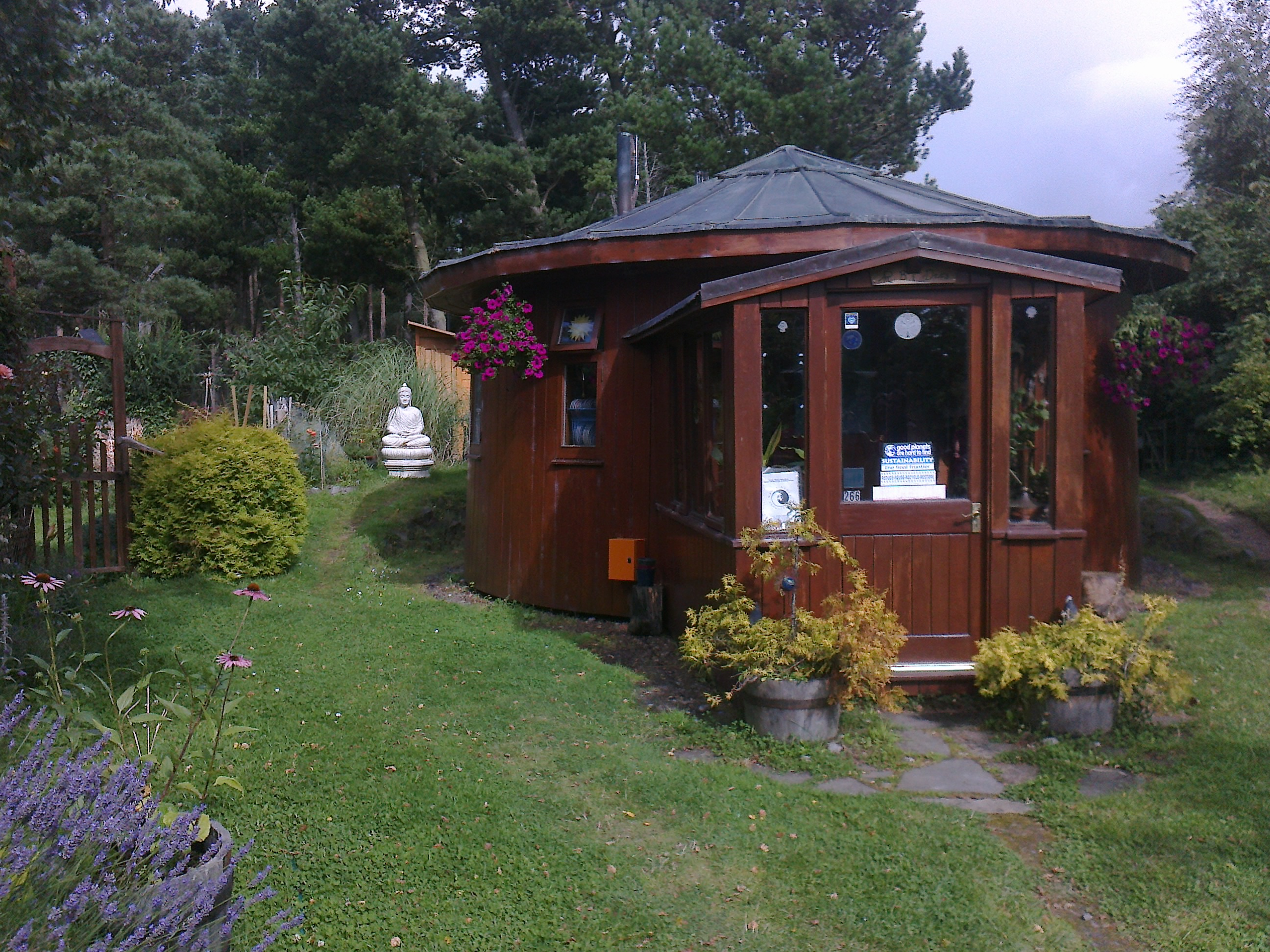
Whisky Barrel House, Findhorn, Scotland

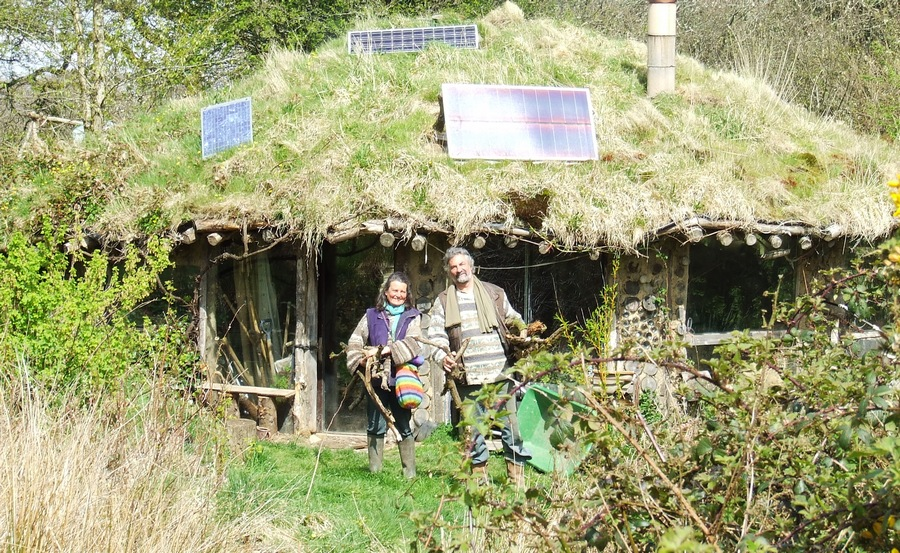
That Roundhouse, Pembrokeshire, Wales

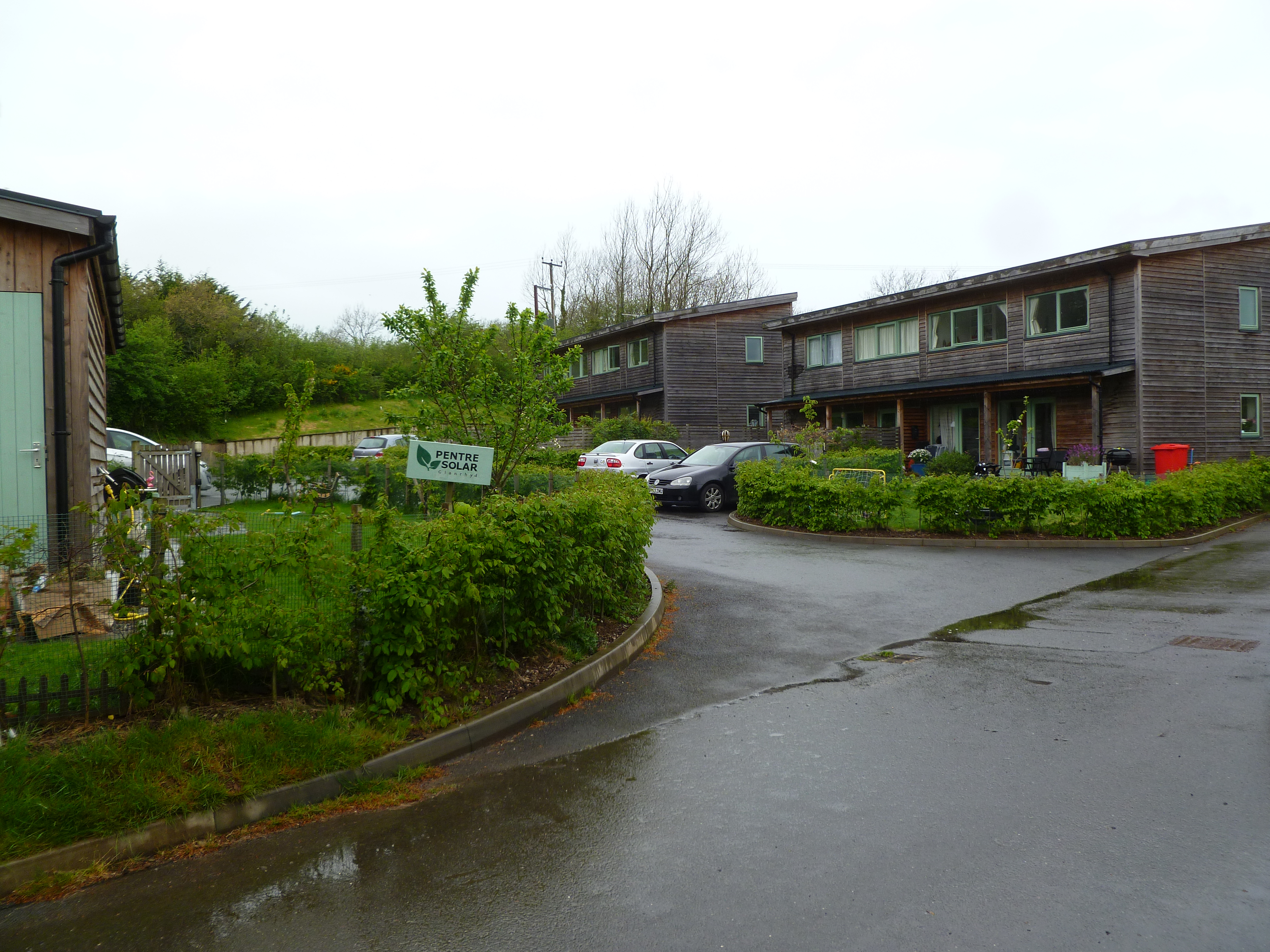
Pentre Solar, Glanrhyd, Pembrokeshire, Wales

English LID examples include the Hockerton Housing Project (Nottinghamshire), Michael Buck's cob house in Oxfordshire, Landmatters (Devon) and Tinker's Bubble (Somerset).

Transition Homes, currently under development in Transition Town Totnes, Devon, is an attempt to scale-up and mainstream LID by providing around 25 low cost, low carbon homes designed along permaculture principles. Residents will be allocated from the local housing needs register. Similarly, LILAC built in 2013 a 'Low Impact Living Affordable Community' of 20 homes and a common house in Bramley, Leeds, which was visited by Kevin McCloud and Mark Prisk, Minister of State for Housing and Local Government.

BedZED (London) is another example of a larger scale LID, which was built in 2000–2002 and has 82 homes, however it is not as affordable as many of the above examples as it was partly designed to attract urban professionals.

=== Scotland ===
Findhorn Ecovillage has won a number of international awards. Steve James's Straw House, Dumfries was built for £4,000.

=== Wales ===
The House of the Future, Cardiff, completed in 2000, was originally a showcase of the latest green building technologies, and later transformed into an education centre. That Roundhouse (Brithdir Mawr, Newport, Pembrokeshire) was granted planning permission in 2008 with a review in 3 years. In West Wales, Lammas Ecovillage (near Crymych, Pembrokeshire) is a community of independent, off-grid households begun in 2009. Nearby Pwll Broga roundhouse is a development that was built without planning permission in 2012, refused retrospective planning permission in 2014, but granted permission in July 2015, having met the requirements of the Welsh government's One Planet Development (OPD) policy. From 2010 to 2019, 24 applications had been approved in Wales, with the majority in Pembrokeshire, but there has been criticism that the developments were not being properly monitored for compliance with OPD: in essence that "developers can show they can make a basic income off the land and provide all their own energy and water". According to the BBC, in 2019 there were 41 registered OPD dwellings in Wales, with a climate scientist claiming there was scope, in terms of available land, for up to 10,000 such developments.

In 2017, the term "eco-hamlet" was used to describe Pentre Solar, a development of six houses at Glanrhyd, near Llantood, Pembrokeshire; using locally sourced timber, solar power and shared electric transport, the project was designed for local people on the council housing waiting list, and was supported by the Welsh Government. This was the first such project in Wales, and possibly in the UK, and was created by Western Solar, the company that established the first solar park in Wales, at Rhosygilwen, Rhoshill.

== Benefits ==
Substantial research has concluded that LID represents some of the most innovative and sustainable development in the UK.

LIDs have innovated and demonstrated sustainable solutions including low/zero carbon housing design, rainwater harvesting, renewable energy generation, waste minimisation and innovative forms of land management, including No/low-till farming, permaculture and agroforestry.

LID has also shown a capacity to enhance local biodiversity and public access to local space, and to produce traffic movements far below the national average. This has been attributed to lift-sharing, to residents' greater use of public transport, walking and cycling and to the integration of local land based employment with other household activities. As the Welsh Assembly Government has noted, such "...Development therefore is not just describing a physical development. It is describing a way of living differently where there is a symbiotic relationship between people and land, making a reduction in environmental impacts possible".

== Constraints ==
Over the years, there have been various struggles with planning authorities over LID in the UK. Tony Wrench spent over a decade fighting the planning authorities until he was granted planning permission for That Roundhouse. As Lisa Lewinsohn points out in her MSc thesis on LID, Tony Wrench and his partner Jane Faith have been "enforced against, fined, refused planning permission several times" while Lammas has "probably spent about £50,000 on the application process." Similarly, since 1986 Tir Penrhos Isaf has tried several times to get planning permission and only succeeded in December 2006, twenty years after their first planning application was submitted.

The residents of Tir Penrhos Isaf consider:

"that current planning and building legislation represent some of the greatest obstacles to developing sustainable systems in Britain. The legislation favours those who already have land and property, actively encourages the squandering of resources and environmental degradation and actively discourages movements towards low impact, sustainable development."

== Government policy ==
The extensive research interest in LID, backed up by the practical examples of the existing LIDs, has led to a growing number of planning policies in the UK designed to allow for LIDs. and the Welsh Assembly Government's One Planet Development policy (OPD) which is supported by the independent One Planet Council. The first development to receive permanent planning permission under the One Planet scheme was Nant-y-Cwm, near Caerphilly. The criteria for OPD in Wales include the requirement that 65% of all subsistence, or 30% of food and 35% of livelihood, come from the land.

== See also ==
- Degrowth
- Diggers and Dreamers
- Ecovillage
- Radical Routes
