= Brithdir Mawr =

Settlement in Pembrokeshire, Wales

Coordinates: 52.00°N 4.81°W

- Location within Pembrokeshire
- OS grid reference: SN073373
- Principal area: Pembrokeshire
- Country: Wales
- Sovereign state: United Kingdom
- Police: Dyfed-Powys
- Fire: Mid and West Wales
- Ambulance: Welsh

Brithdir Mawr was an intentional community in Pembrokeshire, South Wales. Founded in 1993 it came to an end in 2026 when the landowner sold the property.

== Community ==
The community was based on an 80 acres (32 ha) farm. In 2019 it was home to 10 adults and 7 children who live in individual family flats around the farmyard. The land was farmed organically (although not certified, partly due to cost, mostly due to the belief that chemical farmers should pay for certification to show their food is safe rather than traditional, organic food growers incurring financial penalties) and the community was off-grid for supplies of water, electricity and wood being used for fuel in heating and cooking.

People worked both locally and on-site to manage the farm and earn a living. The aim of the community was to live an environmentally sustainable and ethical lifestyle. Their work was based on three "pillars" of community, sustainability and education. In 2017 they owned four horses, three goats, four geese, four ducks and three beehives.

== History ==
In 1993, architectural historian Julian Orbach and his wife Emma Orbach set up the community in the foothills of Mynydd Carningli, near Newport, Pembrokeshire within the Pembrokeshire Coast National Park without planning permission or publicity. The Orbachs initially renovated a rundown farmhouse and moved in with their three children. Other buildings were built, including a roundhouse with a turf roof, later to become known as That Roundhouse, a wooden marquee, a wood store and a workshop. The community in 1998 consisted of 12 adults and 10 children who were mainly vegetarian, grew their own crops and lived off the land.

In 1998 the settlement, which then also included five straw bale buildings and one wooden geodesic dome, was spotted from the air and reported to the authorities. The authorities identified fourteen infringements of planning regulations, including the lake, the cycle shed, the Dome, and the roundhouse. All infringements, except those relating to the Roundhouse, were resolved. In 2019 the cycle shed was still without planning permission.

By 2001 the land was split in three parts, with ownership of the land around the disputed roundhouse being transferred to the Roundhouse Trust. Julian Orbach left the site and moved into the town, but retained ownership of about 80 acres (320,000 m^{2}) including the old farmhouse and outbuildings, which was leased to the Brithdir Mawr Housing Co-op. Emma Orbach adopted the rest, which is known as Tir Ysbrydol (spirit land), and became involved in planning negotiations in relation to new and existing straw bale round huts and structures.

In 2015 Emma featured in an episode of Ben Fogle: New Lives in the Wild.

In 2016 the community was notified by Julian Orbach, the owner at the time, of his intention not to renew the lease from 2020. The community members were offered first refusal to purchase the site at a price of £1 million. However, according to the community's website, the owner then granted them a six-year extension of the lease.

With the community unable to raise £750,000 to buy the property and land, in early 2025 it was sold to Rachel May (a teacher, doula and shadow work coach) who had sold her family home to finance the purchase and planned to open a healing retreat centre. May served an eviction notice on the community, saying she was "not a corporate landlord” but “Some of the community members cannot or will not admit that I own the land." The community countered that they thought they had been given until the end of 2025 to raise finance. The community members were finally given until Sunday 1 November 2026 to leave.

== See also ==
- Low-impact development (UK)
