= Roundhouse (dwelling) =

Type of house with a circular plan, usually with a conical roof

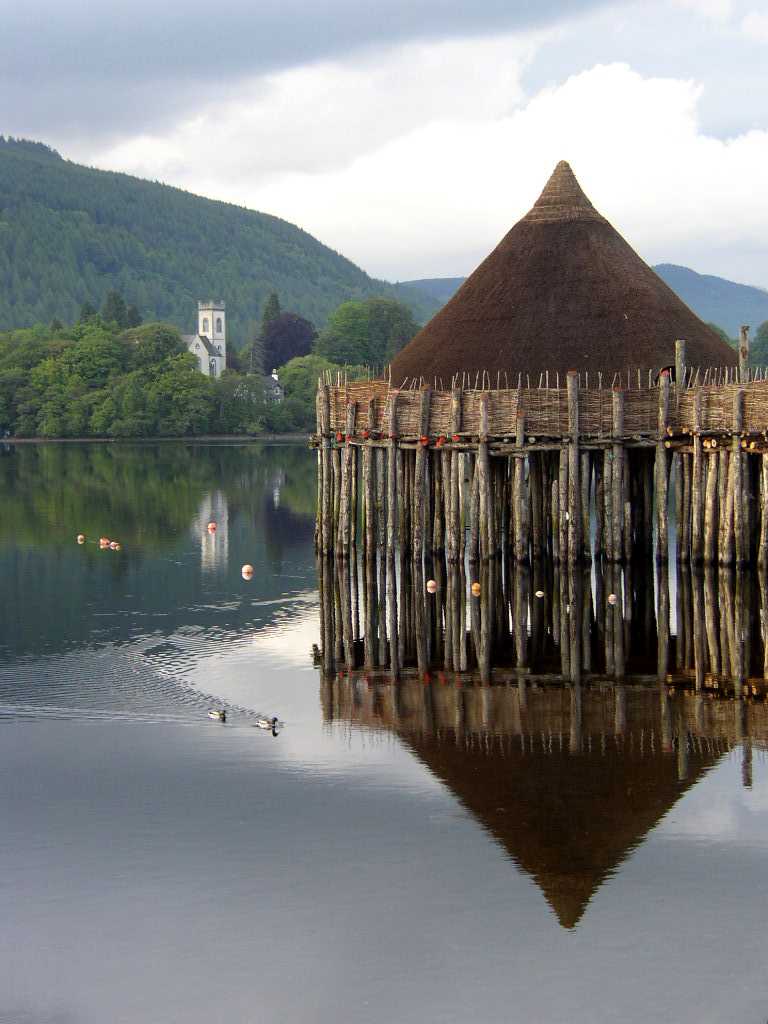
Reconstructed crannog on Loch Tay, Scotland

A roundhouse is a type of house with a circular plan, usually with a conical roof. In the later part of the 20th century, modern designs of roundhouse eco-buildings were constructed with materials such as cob, cordwood or straw bale walls and reciprocal frame green roofs.

== Europe ==
=== United Kingdom ===
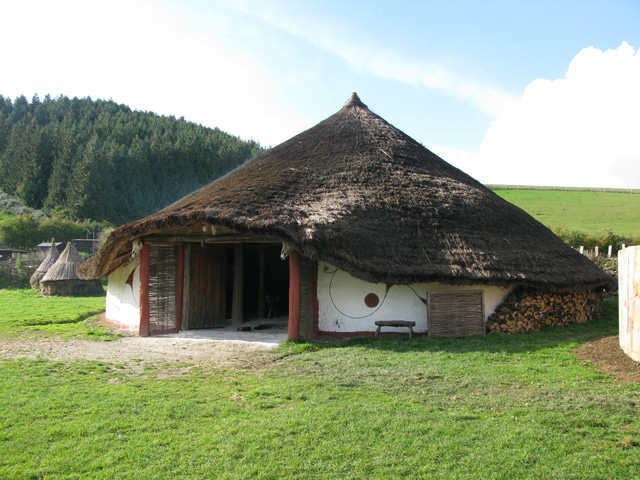
Reconstruction of a British Iron Age Celtic roundhouse at Butser Ancient Farm

Roundhouses were the standard form of housing built in Britain and Ireland from the Bronze Age throughout the Iron Age, and in some areas well into the Sub Roman period. The people built walls made of either stone or of wooden posts joined by wattle-and-daub panels, and topped with a conical thatched roof. These ranged in size from less than 5 m (16 ft) in diameter to over 15 m (49 ft). The Atlantic roundhouse, Broch, and Wheelhouse styles were used in Scotland. The remains of many Bronze Age roundhouses can still be found scattered across open heathland, such as Dartmoor, as stone 'hut circles'.

Early archeologists determined what they believed were the characteristics of such structures by the layout of the postholes, although a few timbers were found preserved in bogs. The rest has been postulated by experimental archaeology, which has tried different techniques to demonstrate the most likely form and function of the buildings. For example, experiments have shown that a conical roof with a pitch of about 45 degrees would have been the strongest and most efficient design. According to Peter J. Reynolds fire would have been lit inside for heating and cooking; there could not have been a smoke hole in the apex of the roof, for this would have caused an updraft that would have rapidly set fire to the thatch. Instead, smoke would have been allowed to accumulate harmlessly inside the roof space, and slowly leak out through the thatch. However, modern reconstructions of ancient roundhouses are ultimately based on a number of assumptions made by archaeologists which might make reconstructions quite different to the original.

Many modern simulations of roundhouses have been built, including:

Image	Name	Town	County	Country	Notes
	Beeston Castle		Cheshire	England	Bronze Age roundhouse dating from 2000 BC. Reconstruction built in 2019
	Barbury Castle	Swindon	Wiltshire	England	(destroyed by fire)
	Bodrifty Iron Age Settlement		Cornwall	England	
	Bostadh Iron Age settlement	Great Bernera	Outer Hebrides	Scotland	Built 1999
	Brigantium Archeological Centre	High Rochester	Northumberland	England	Now Dismantled
	Butser Ancient Farm		Hampshire	England	
	Cae Mabon			Wales	
	Castell Henllys		Pembrokeshire	Wales	
	Cockley Cley,	near Swaffham	Norfolk	England	
	Flag Fen	near Peterborough		England	
	Mellor roundhouse reconstruction		Greater Manchester	England	
	Peat Moors Centre		Somerset	England	Closed to the public 31 October 2008
	Ryedale Folk Museum	near Pickering	North Yorkshire	England	
Celtic roundhouse village.	St. Fagans museum, Wales.		South Glamorgan	Wales	The museum exhibition open for 20 years and was based on roundhouses in Conderton, Worcestershire.
Bryn Eryr	St Fagans National History Museum		South Glamorgan	Wales	New exhibition opened in 2016.
	Scottish Crannog Centre	Loch Tay	Perthshire	Scotland	Roundhouse reconstruction on a man made island (destroyed by fire in 2021). A replacement Iron Age village including a roundhouse has been built since.
	Stonehenge Visitor Centre Neolithic roundhouses		Wiltshire	England	
	Tatton Iron Age roundhouse and pit		Cheshire	England	
	Llynnon Mill, Llanddeusant		Anglesey	Wales	
	Whithorn Iron Age roundhouse		Whithorn	Scotland	

=== Must Farm revelations ===
Much of the earlier supposition was confirmed or denied at a stroke by the finding of a set of Bronze Age roundhouses at the archaeological dig at Must Farm in Cambridgeshire, UK, where samples of all the materials, from posts to walls, to roof were all found, collapsed and charred, but still in situ after 3,000 years.

==== Modern British roundhouses ====
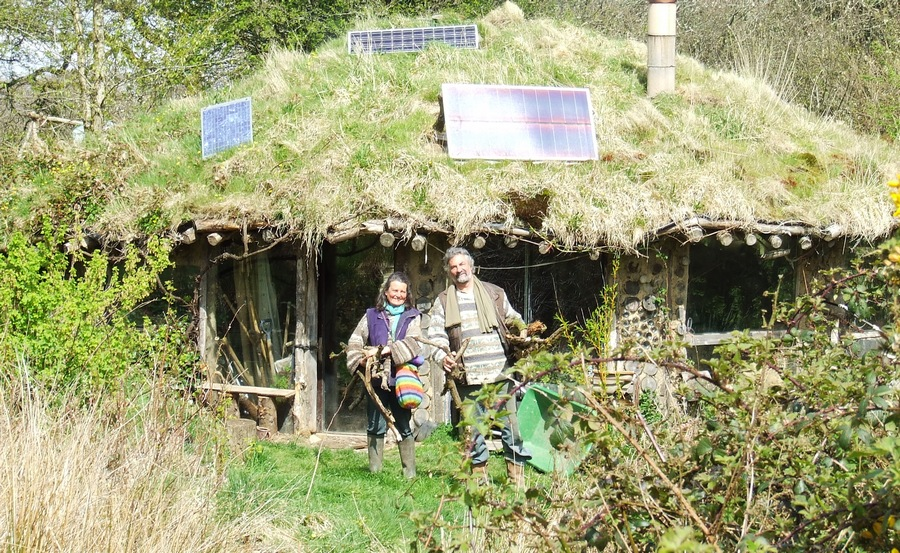
That Roundhouse, constructed in 1997

That Roundhouse is an early example of a modern roundhouse dwelling which was built in Pembrokeshire Coast National Park, Wales without planning permission as part of the Brithdir Mawr village which was discovered by the authorities in 1998. It is constructed from a wooden frame of hand-cut Douglas Fir forest thinnings with cordwood infill, and reciprocal frame turf roof based on permaculture principles mainly from local natural resources. It was subject to a lengthy planning battle including a court injunction to force its demolition before finally receiving planning approval for 3 years in September 2008.

=== Ireland ===
Irish crannógs were roundhouses typically built on an artificial island in a lake, bog, or estuary. Reconstructions of crannógs can be seen in Craggaunowen, the Irish National Heritage Park, and in Wexford, Ireland.

=== Italy ===
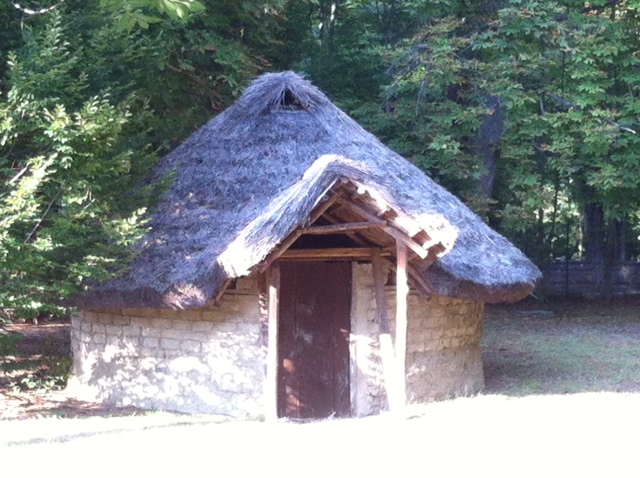
Reconstruction of a Villanovan hut in the Giardini Margherita, Bologna, Italy

Circular thatched huts similar to British roundhouses were constructed by Bronze Age and Iron Age cultures in Italy, notably by the Villanovan culture and the related Latial culture associated with the early Latins and Romans. A similar hut representing the 'Hut of Romulus' (Casa Romuli), the supposed home of the legendary founder of Rome, was maintained on the Palatine Hill in the centre of Rome throughout the Republic and Imperial periods.

Trulli (singular: trullo) are houses with conical roofs, and sometimes circular walls, found in parts of the southern Italian region of Apulia.

=== Spain ===
==== Galicia – Asturias ====
===== Pallozas =====
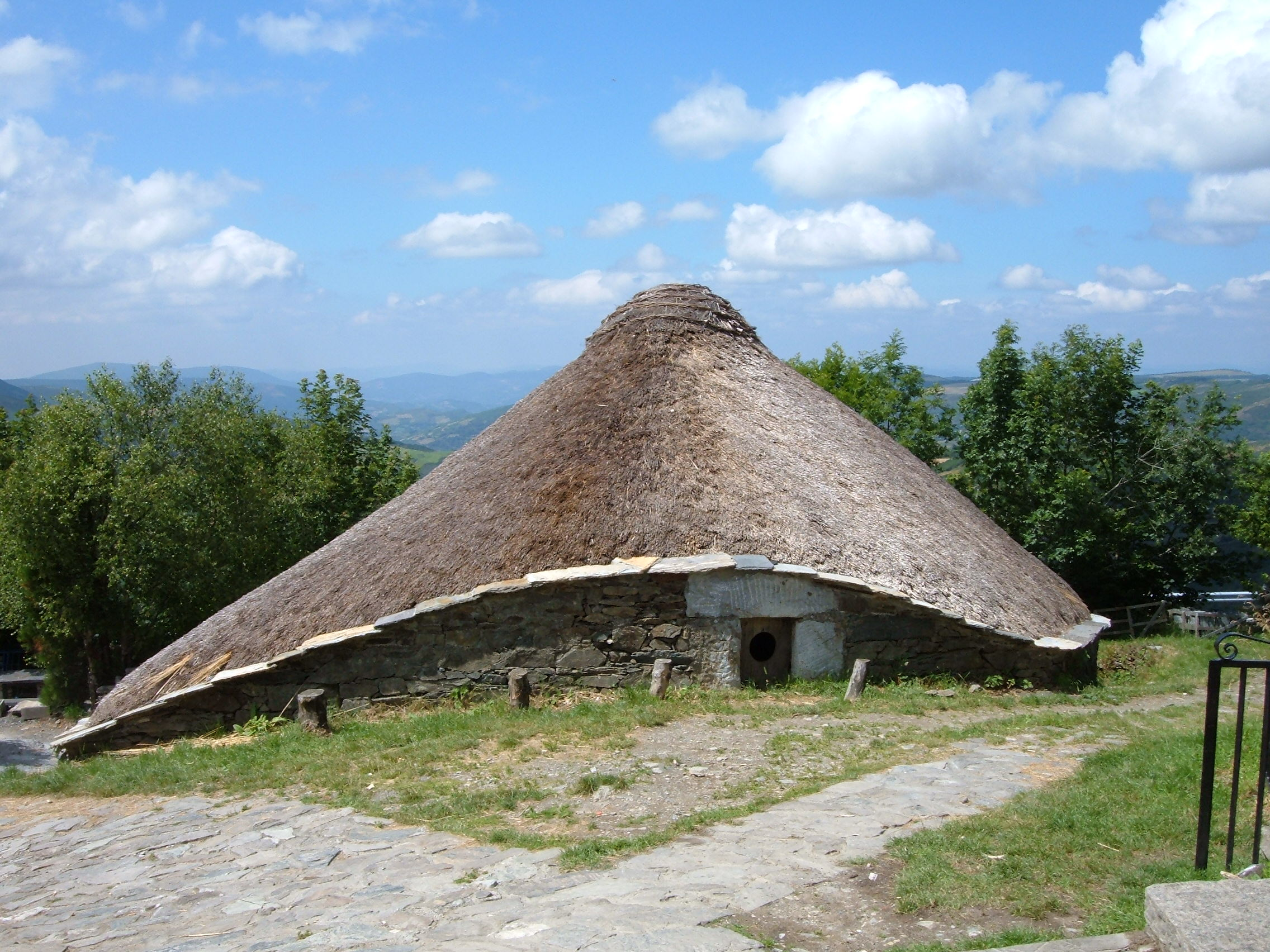
A palloza in Galicia, Spain

A palloza is a traditional thatched house as found in Leonese county of El Bierzo, Serra dos Ancares in Galicia, and south-west of Asturias; corresponding to Astur tribes area, one of pre Hispano-Celtic inhabitants of northwest Hispania. It is circular or oval, about 10 to 20 m (33 to 66 ft) in diameter and is built to withstand severe winter weather at a typical altitude of 1,200 m (3,900 ft).

The main structure is stone, and is divided internally into separate areas for the family and their animals, with separate entrances. The roof is conical, made from rye straw on a wooden frame. There is no chimney, the smoke from the kitchen fire seeps out through the thatch.

As well as living space for humans and animals, a palloza has its own bread oven, workshops for wood, metal and leather work, and a loom. Only the eldest couple of an extended family had their own bedroom, which they shared with the youngest children. The rest of the family slept in the hay loft, in the roof space.

== North America ==
Roundhouses were a common form of architecture in some Native American Tribes. Traditional roundhouses were often used for ceremonies "and provided a large work area during inclement weather." The Chaw Se' Roundhouse in California's Indian Grinding Rock State Historic Park is designated with state historical marker #1001.

Modern roundhouses are being built such as the one at Dancing Rabbit Ecovillage near Rutledge, Missouri, built of cob.

== South America ==
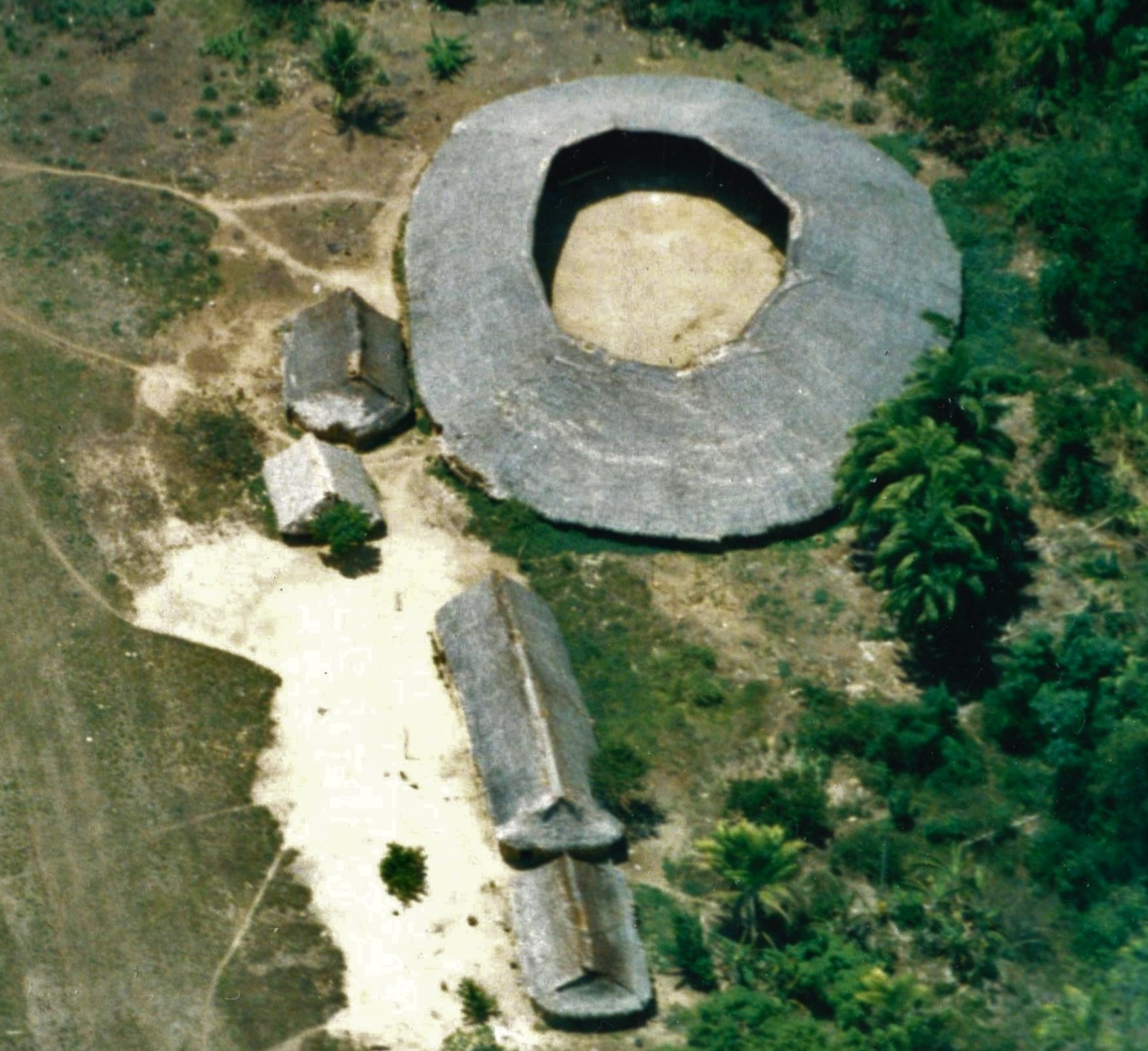
Aerial view of a Yanomami shabono in northern Brazil. Outlying buildings are for the privacy of newlywed couples, or may be used for the preparation of game and fish.

Roundhouses are still in use by Indigenous peoples in Brazil, including large communal Shabono.

== Asia ==
Buildings in the famous neolithic Chinese village of Banpo, which was occupied between c. 4500-3750 BCE, were round. The roundhouses at Banpo were built using wattle-and-daub for the walls and thatch for the roofs. Banpo has been designated the type site (representative model) of the Yangshao culture, which was the predecessor of the Longshan culture, which in turn evolved into the Erlitou culture

== Africa ==
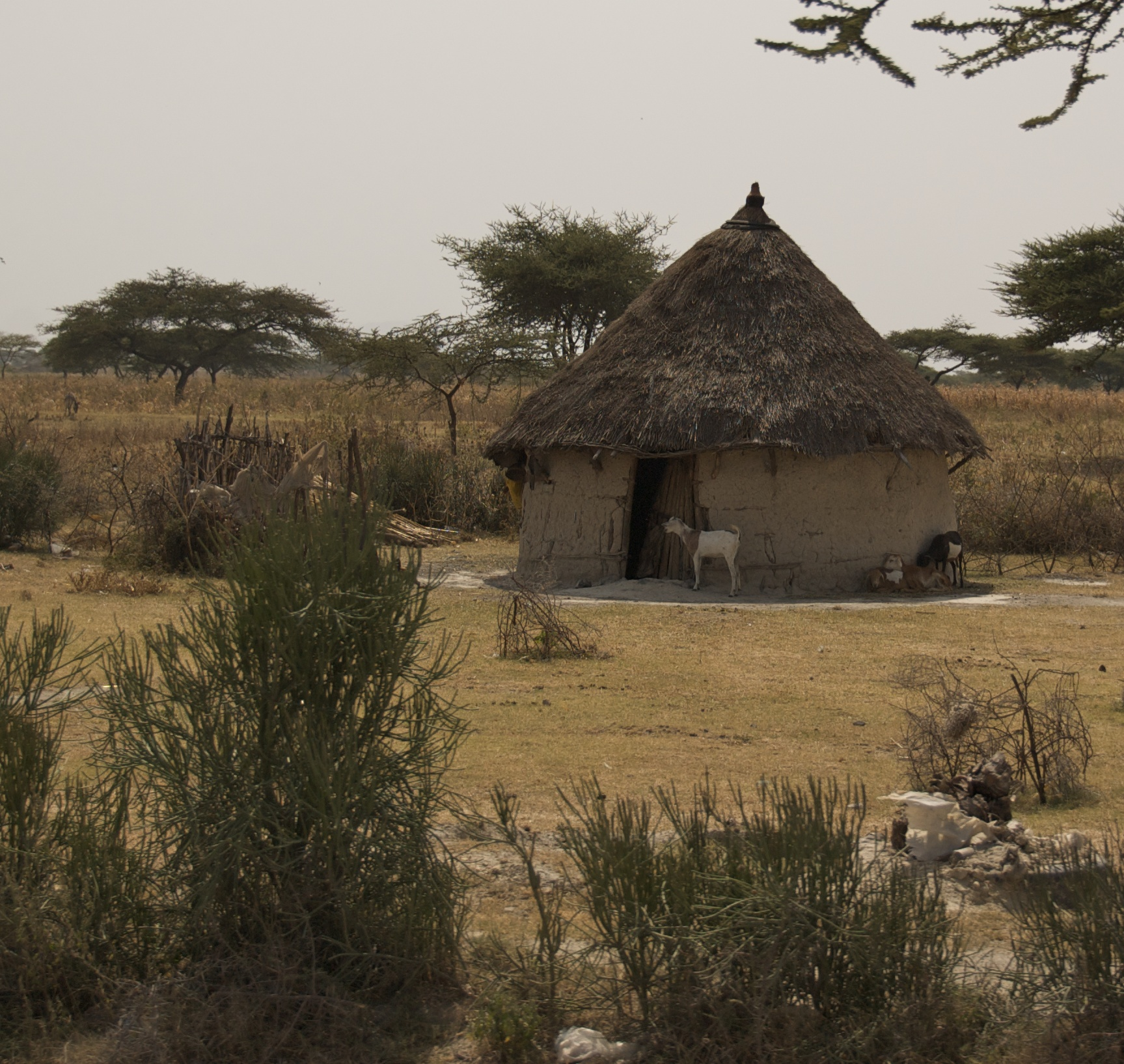
A traditional African hut in Ethiopia

The African round hut is still in use.

== Oceania ==
Raun Haus roundhouses are still in use in Papua New Guinea and are very similar to the ones built in western Europe.

== Arctic ==
The Igloo is a temporary roundhouse built from ice.
