= Diggers and Dreamers =

Magazine advocating communal living

Diggers and Dreamers is a group that promotes intentional communities in England, Scotland, Wales and Northern Ireland.

== History ==
Diggers and Dreamers started out as a book based directory, first published in 1989 as a resource for information, issues, and ideas about intentional communities and communal living in the UK. The project was an offshoot of the Communes Network, a loose organisation that was established at a meeting on 15–16 February 1975 organised by the Communes Movement, which itself was started in 1968 by Selene Community, and which had achieved a distribution of 3000 copies of its journal, Communes: Journal of the Communes Movement, in March 1971.

The Guide to Communal Living (and from 1999 accompanying website) focusses on all aspects of communal living. Alongside the journal there is a directory of communal groups. More recently Diggers and Dreamers have published a number of book reviews, conference presentations and books other than the Guide to Communal Living.

== Themes ==
Over the years the publication has covered a wide variety of topics connected with communal living and has featured articles by both those living communally and those studying it. The themes covered by articles include:

- Decision-making
- Manual labour
- Childcare
- Income pooling
- Developmental communalism
- Developing Cohousing in the UK
- Why Feminism needs Utopianism
- Voluntary Simplicity
- Low Impact Development
- Degrowth
- The value of art in community
- Research and development for Utopia

== See also ==
- Radical Routes
- Fellowship for Intentional Community
- Communities Directory
