= Reciprocal frame =

Arrangement of construction beams

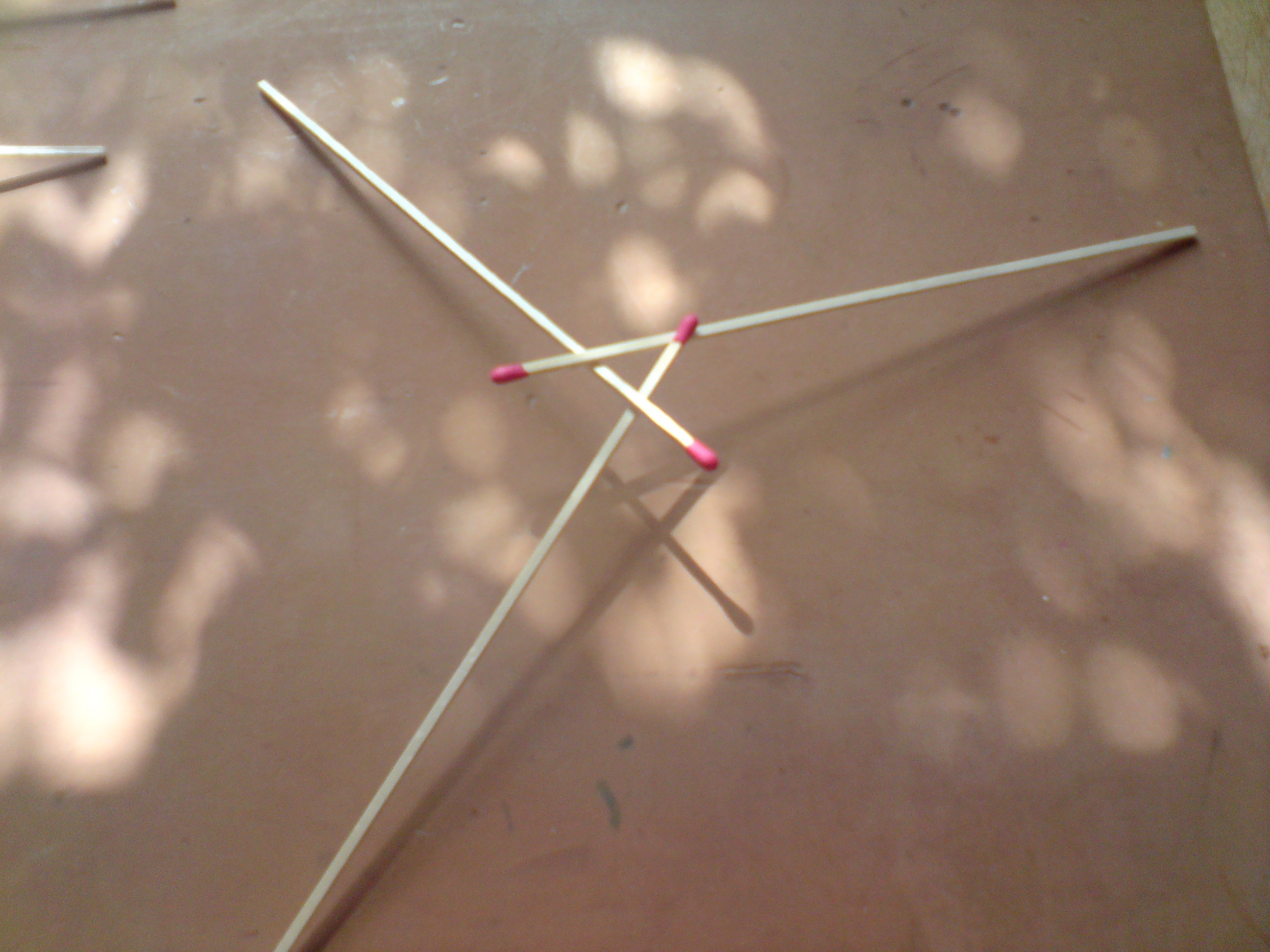
A simple three stick frame

A reciprocal frame is a class of self-supporting structure made of three or more beams and which requires no center support to create roofs, bridges or similar structures.

== Construction ==
Reciprocal roofs tend to be constructed in one of two ways. If built using dimensioned timber, each rafter is usually jointed into the previous one. More commonly, these roofs are constructed with roundwood poles where each rafter is laid upon the previous one. In both of these approaches, the roof is assembled by installing a temporary central support that holds the first rafter at the correct height. The first rafter is fitted between the wall and the temporary central support and then further rafters are added, each resting on the last. The final rafter fits on top of the previous rafter and under the very first one. The rafters are then tied before the temporary support is removed. The structure is most effective at lower pitches where there is minimal spreading force exerted at the ringbeam, most being transferred directly downward. Unless some extra elements are added to create redundancy, the structure is only as strong as the weakest element, as the failure of a single element may lead to the failure of the whole structure.

== History ==
The reciprocal frame, also known as a Mandala roof, has been used since the twelfth century in Chinese and Japanese architecture although little or no trace of these ancient methods remain. More recently they were used by architects Kazuhiro Ishii (the Spinning House) and Yasufumi Kijima, and engineer Yoishi Kan (Kijima Stonemason Museum).

Villard de Honnecourt produced sketches showing similar designs in the 13th century and similar structures were also used in the chapter house of Lincoln Cathedral. Josep Maria Jujol used this structure in both the Casa Bofarull and Casa Negre.

== Gallery ==
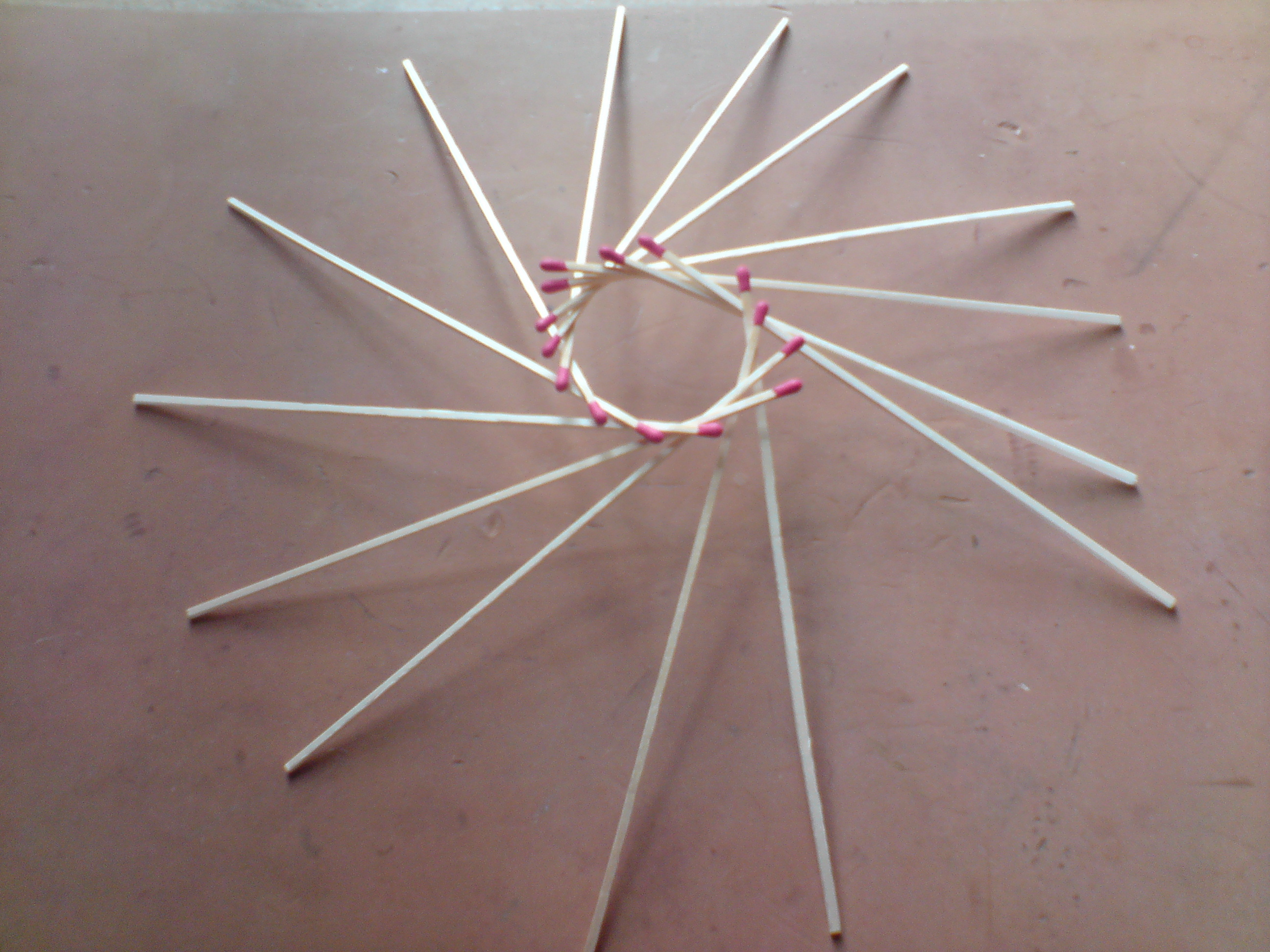

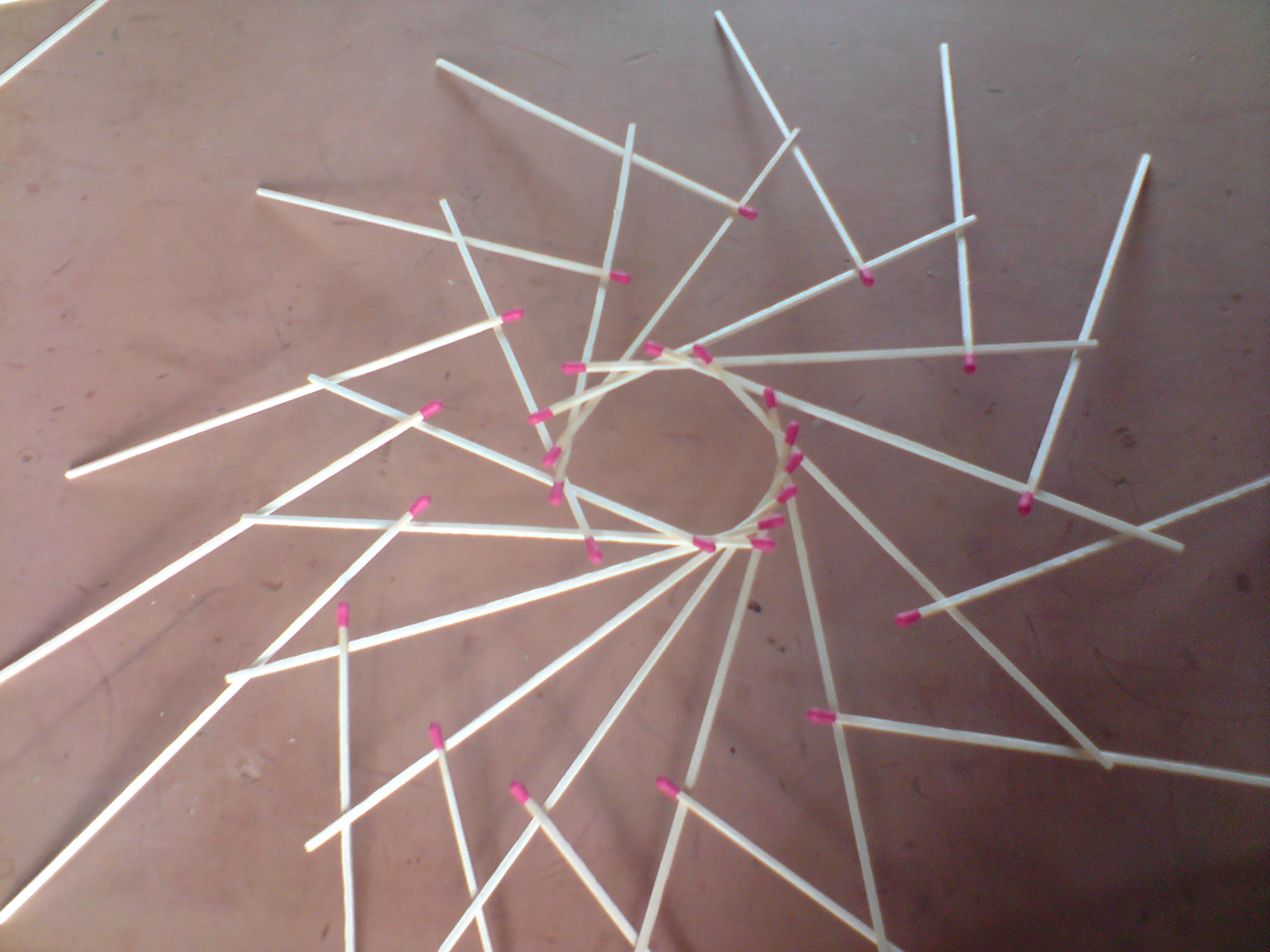

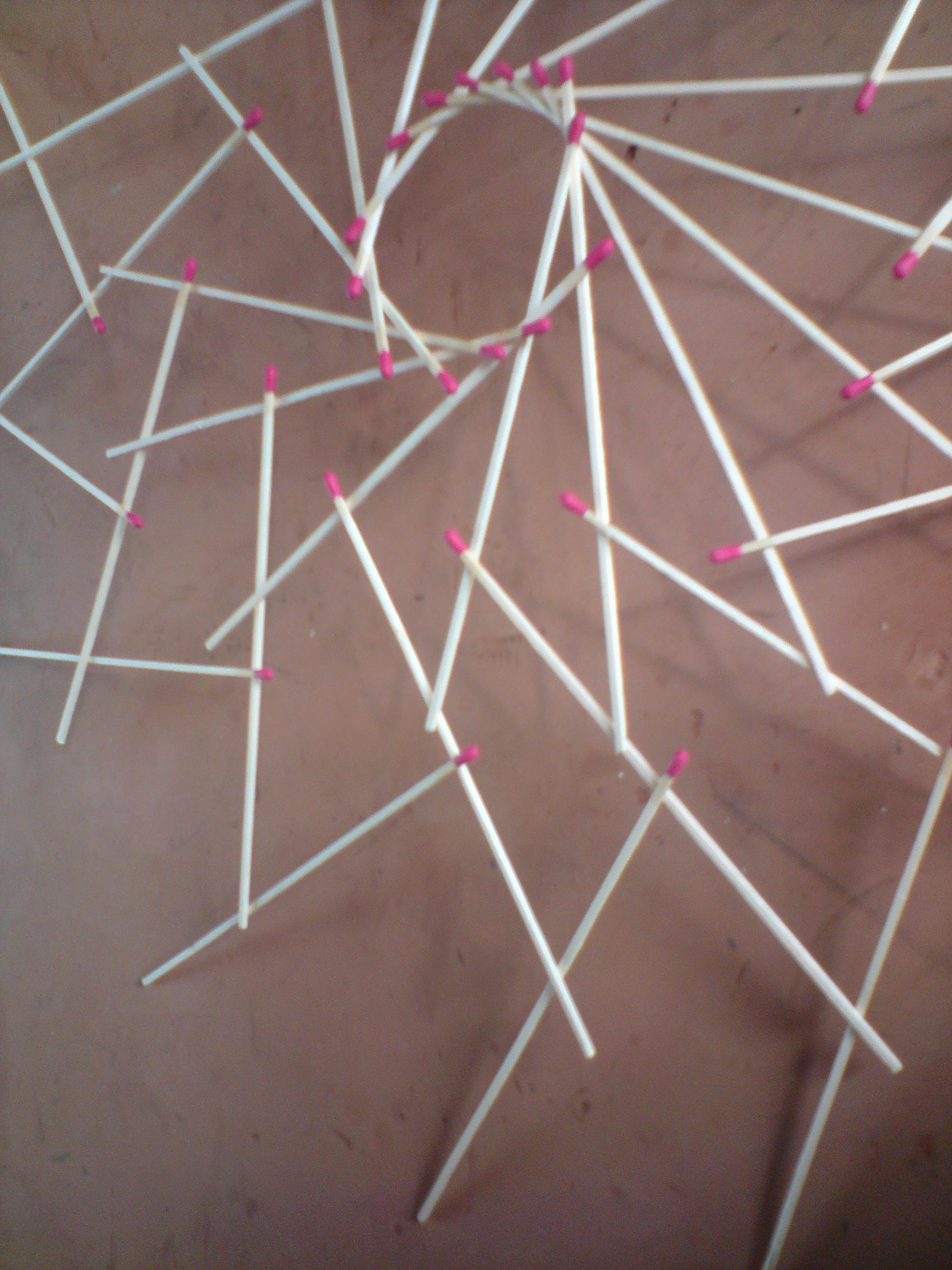

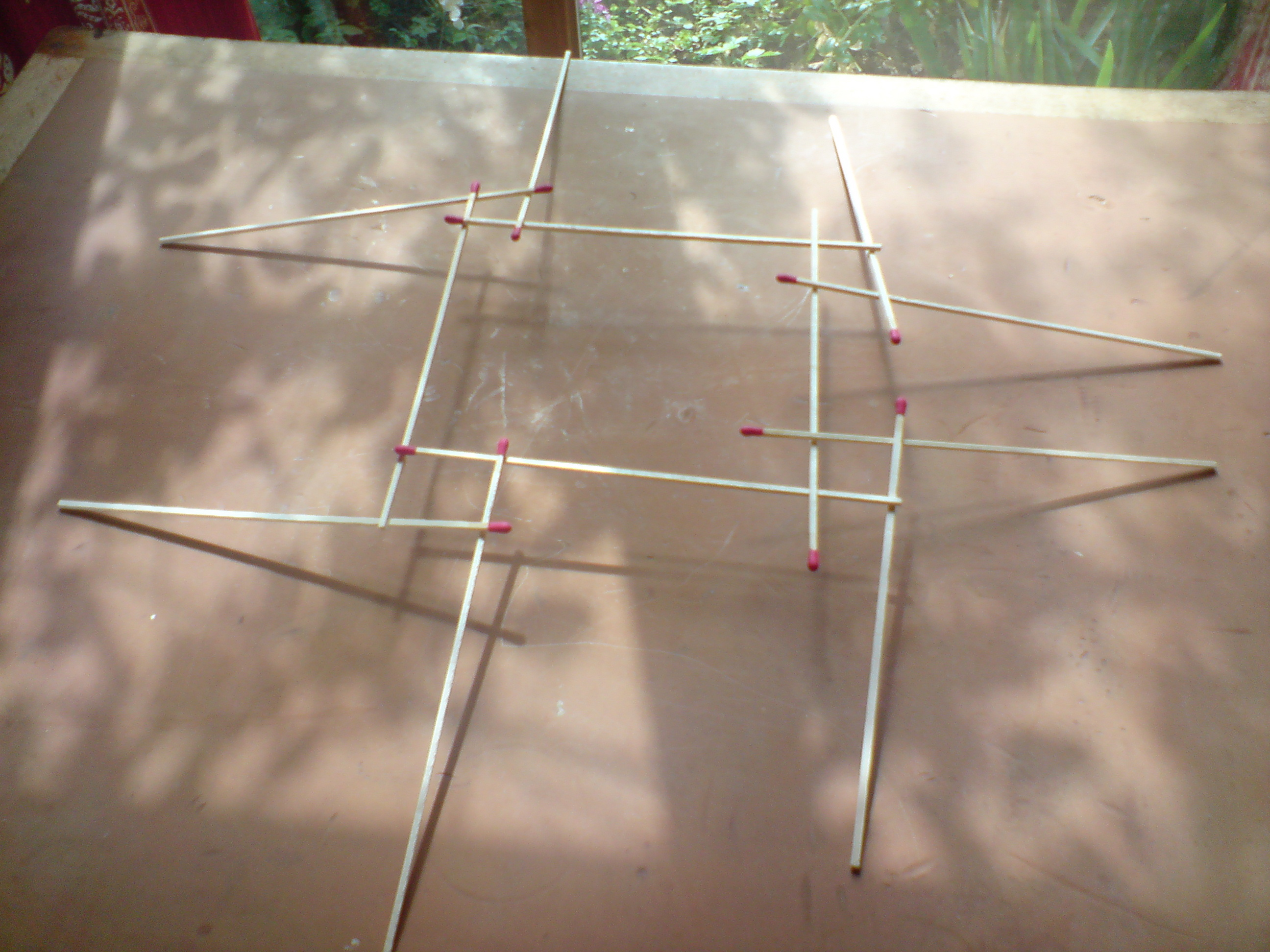

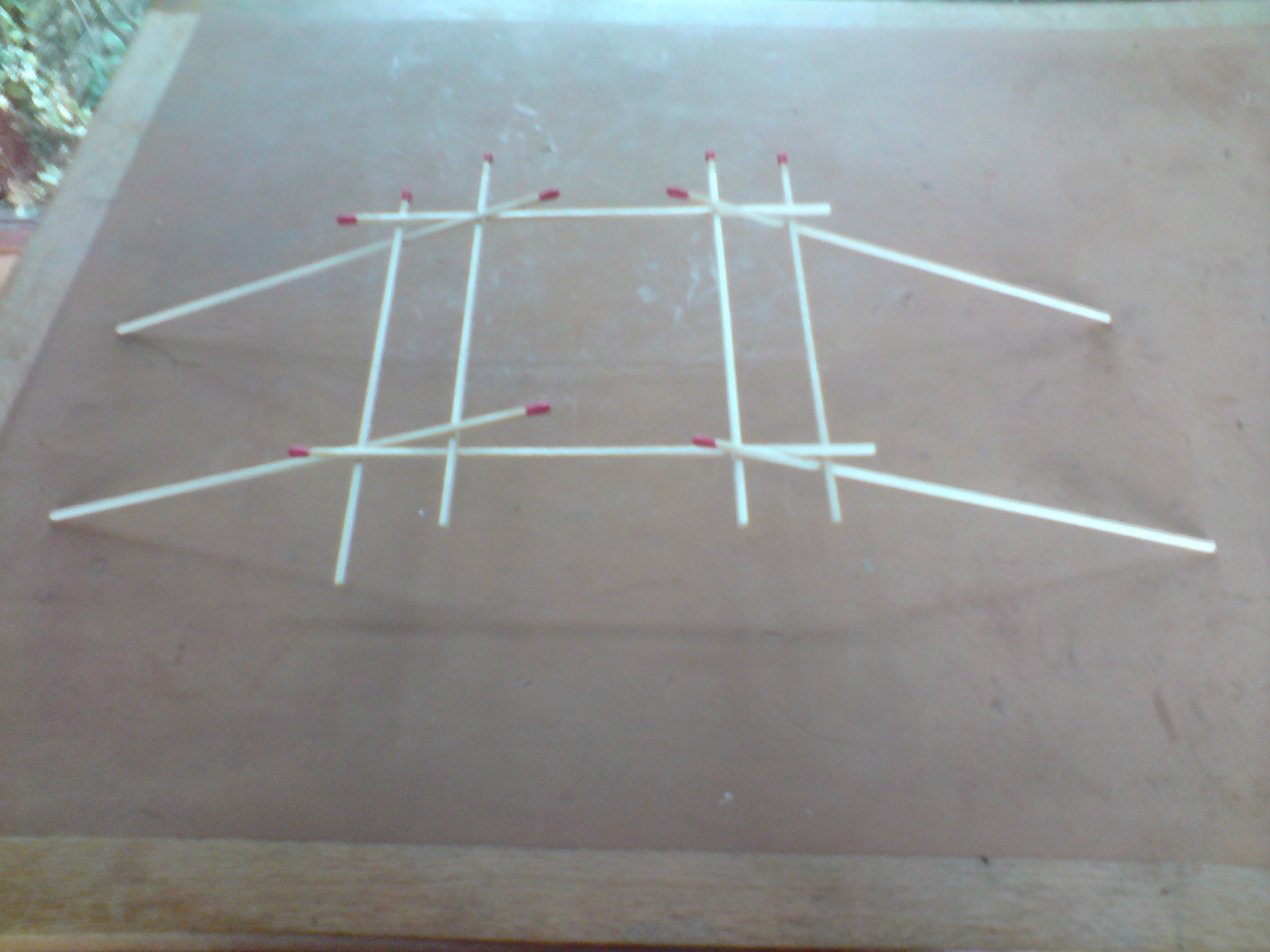

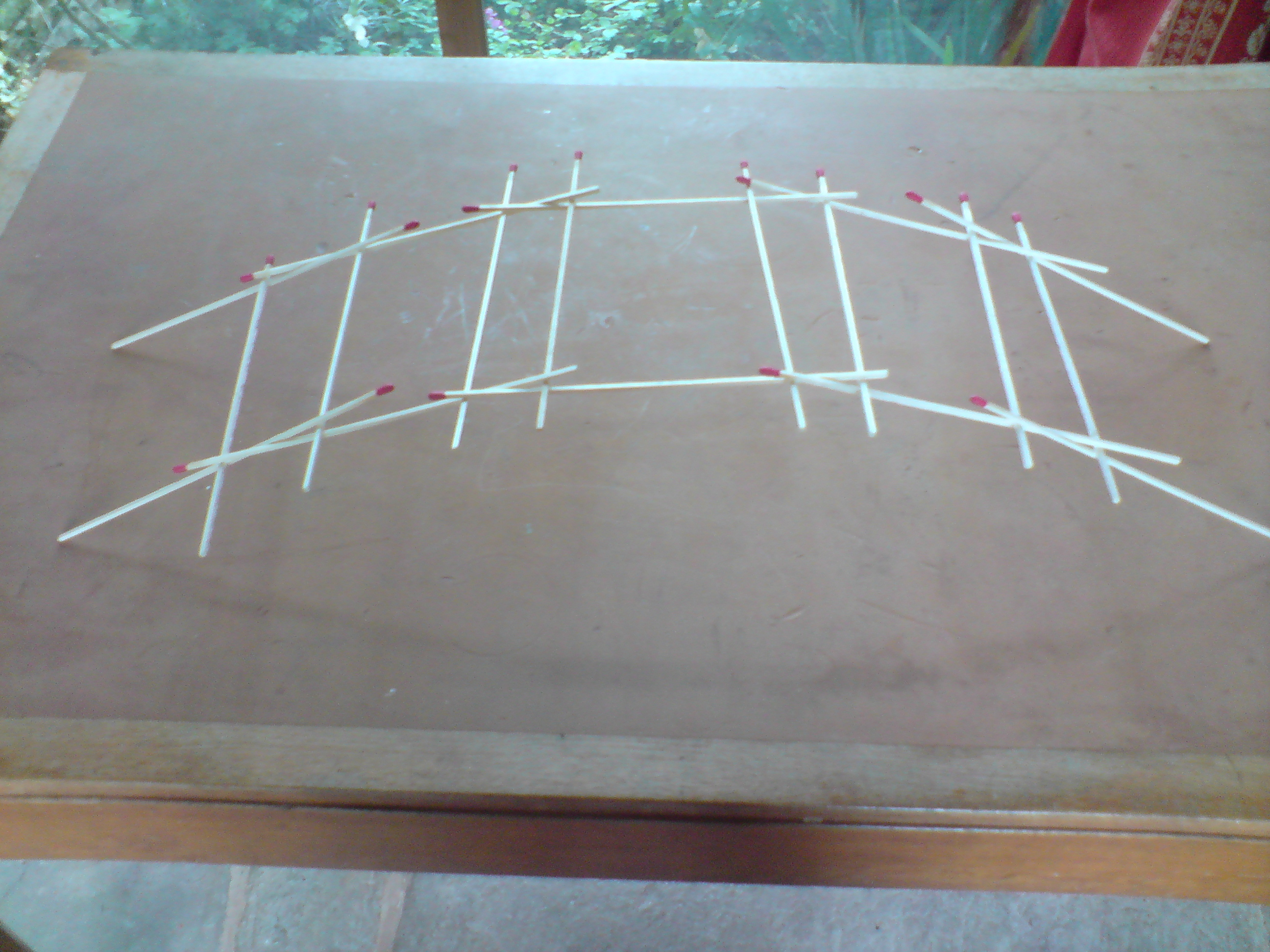

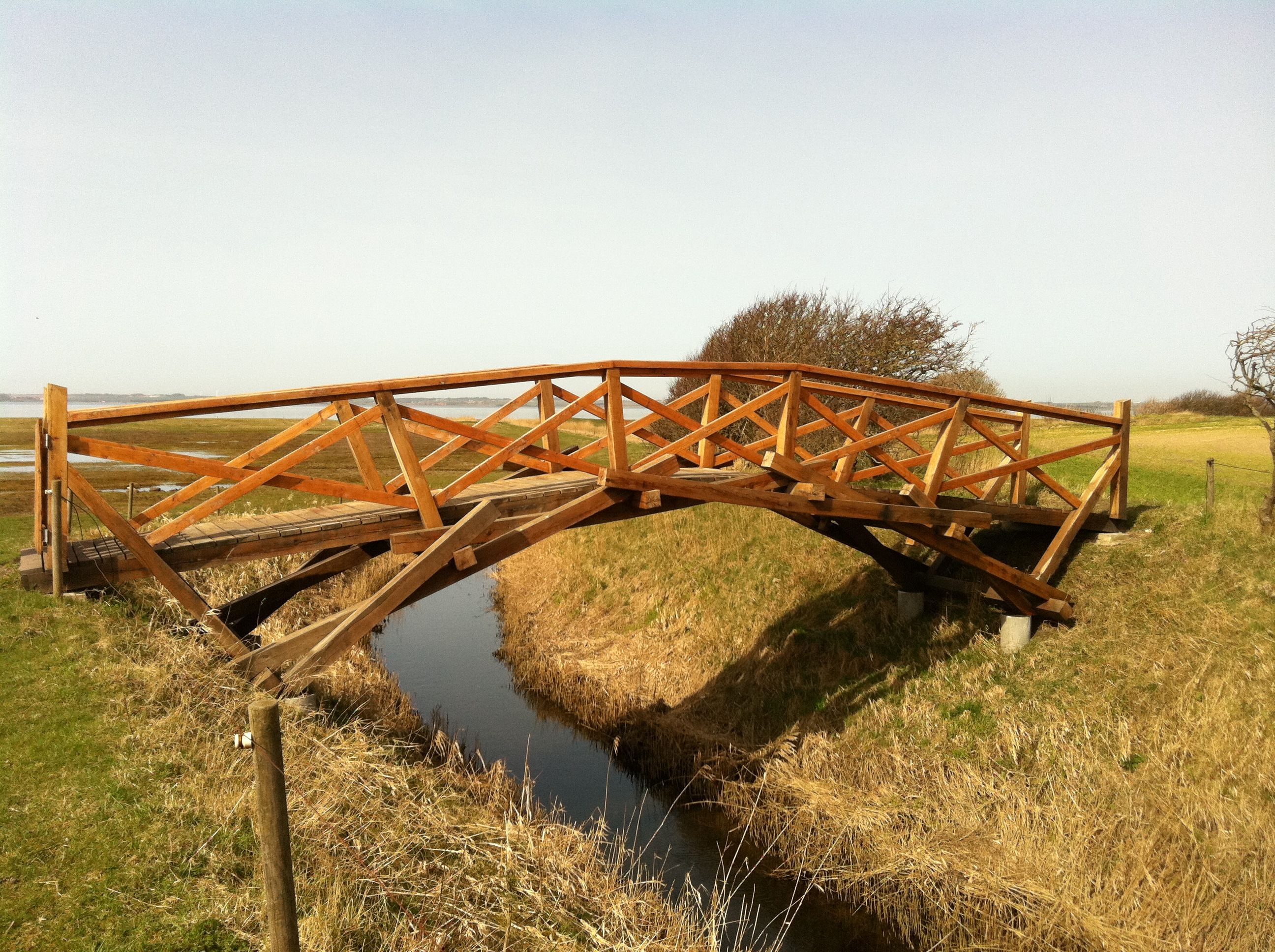

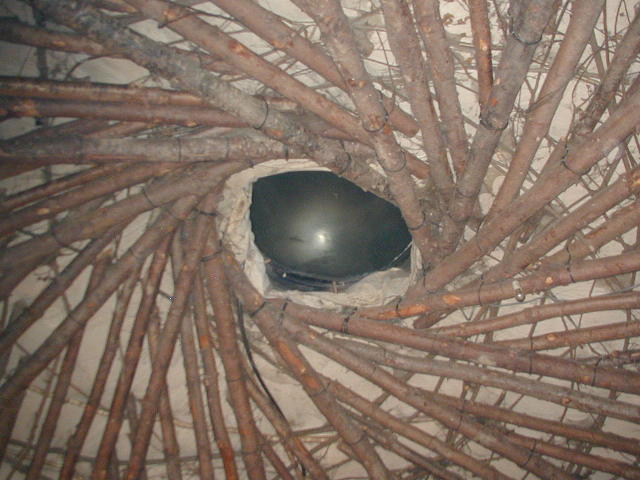
A design using primary & multiple secondary infill rafters (Tony Wrench)

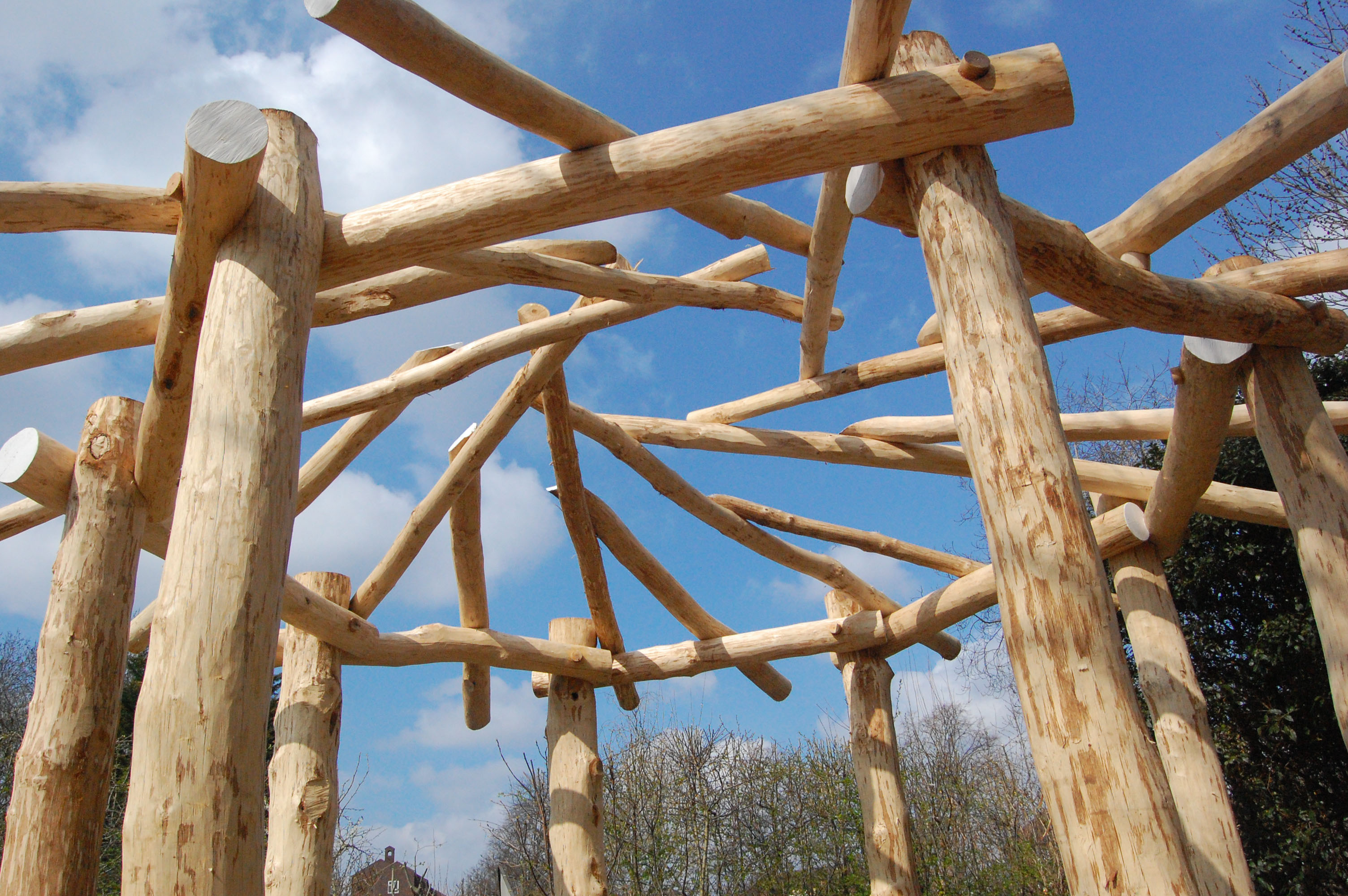
A design using primary & half length secondary rafters (Wholewoods)

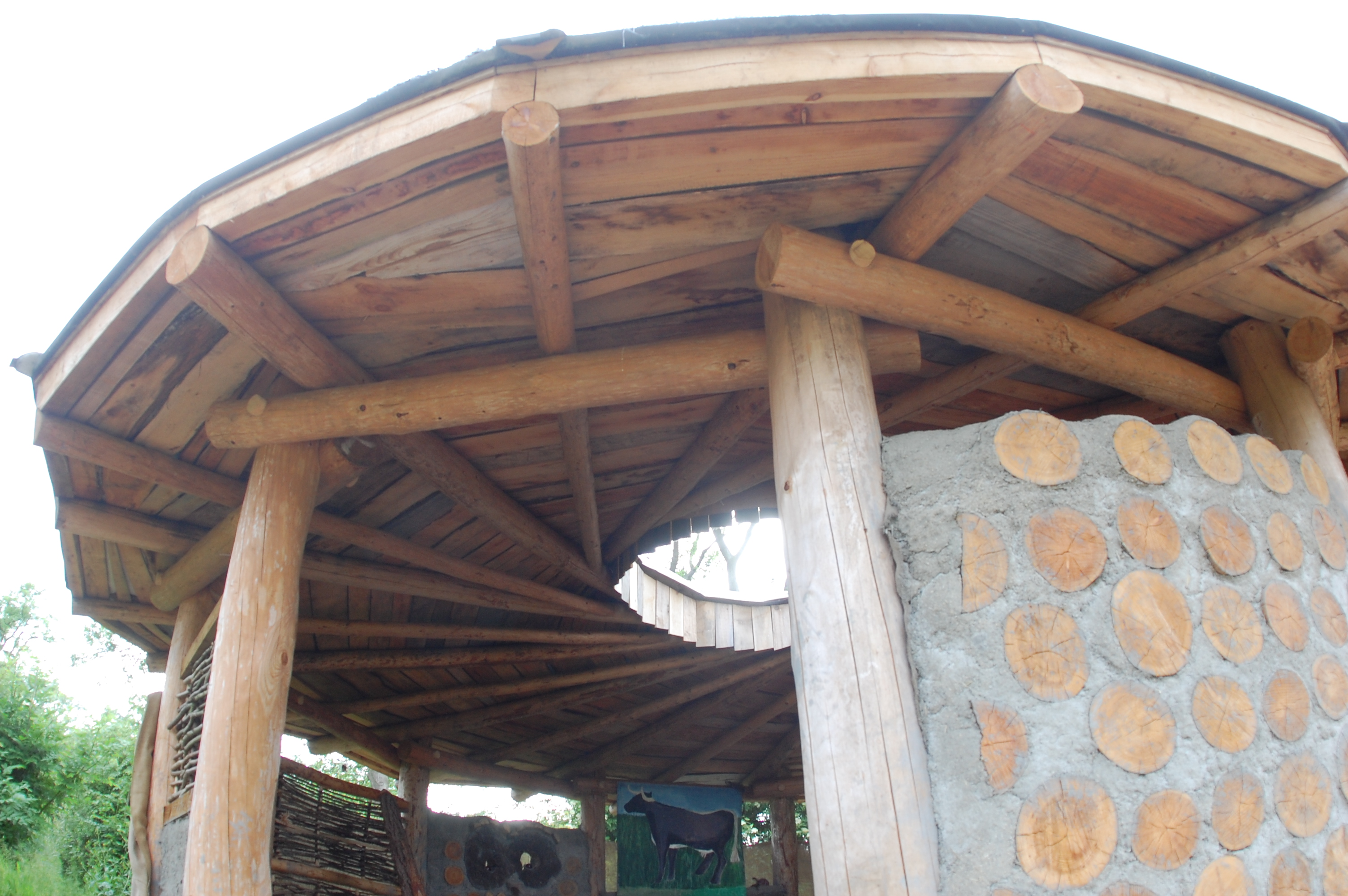
A design using primary and full length secondary rafters (Wholewoods)

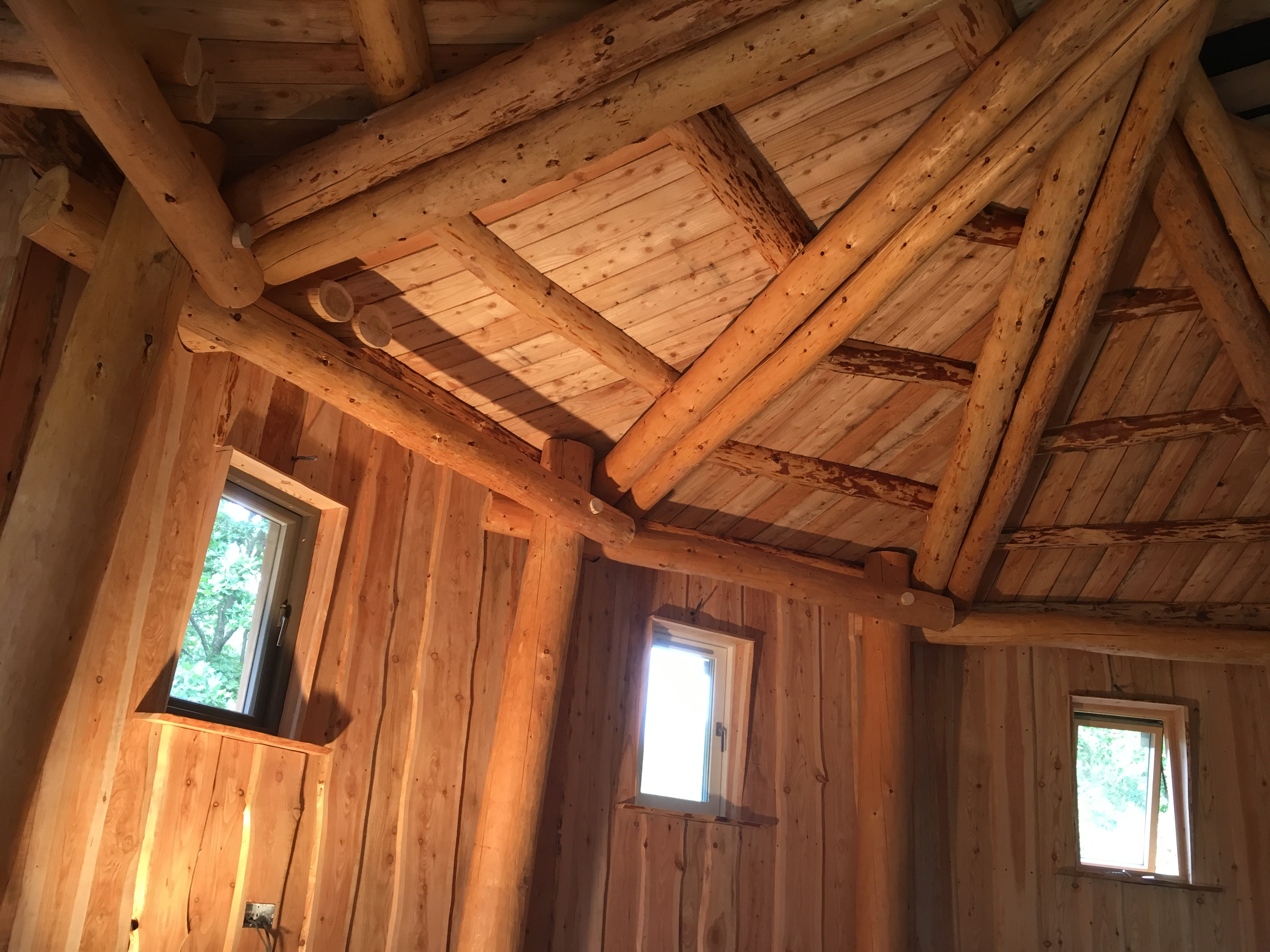
A redundancy technique using double rafter design (Wholewoods)

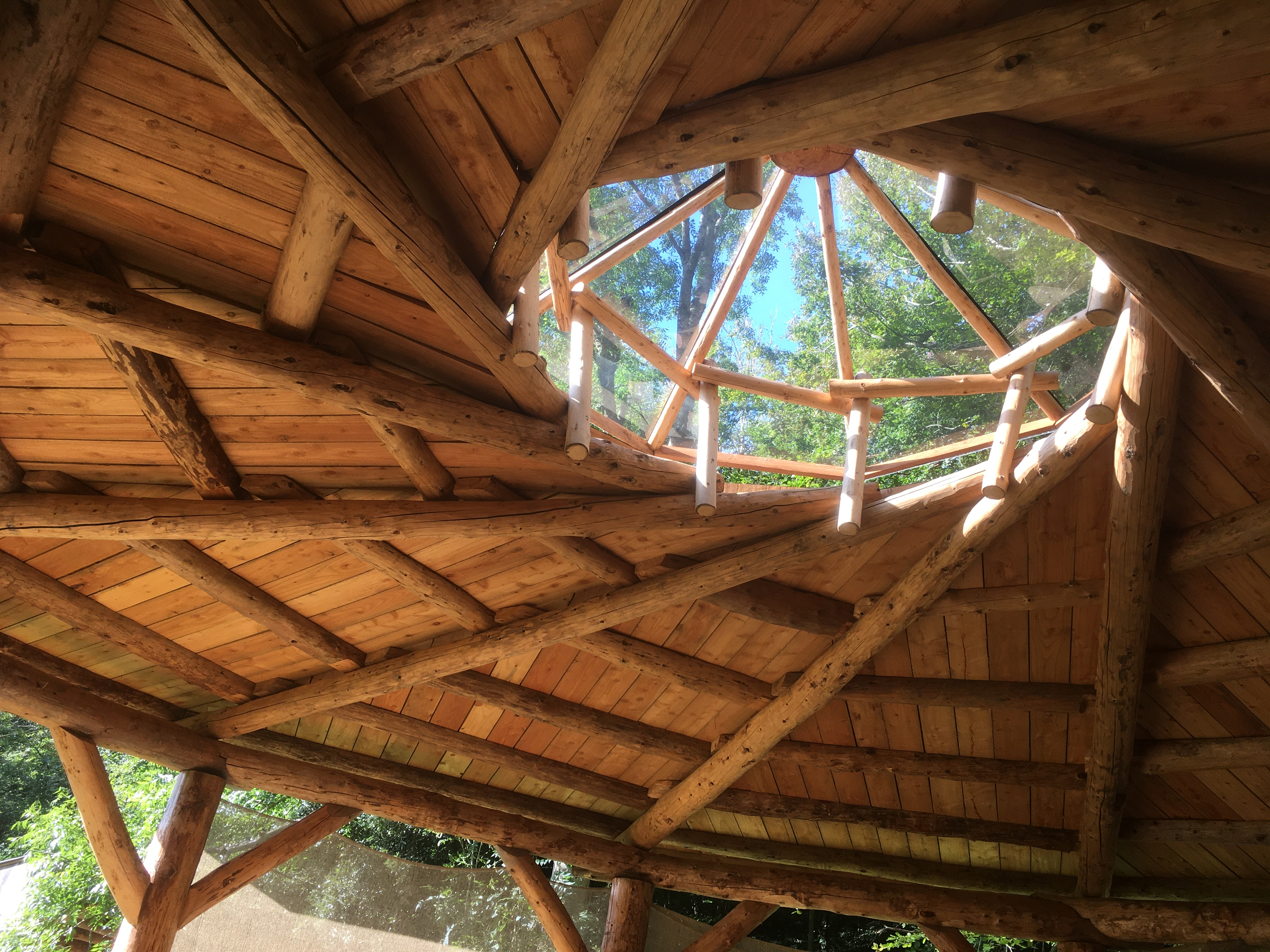
A primary rafter and purlin design (Wholewoods)

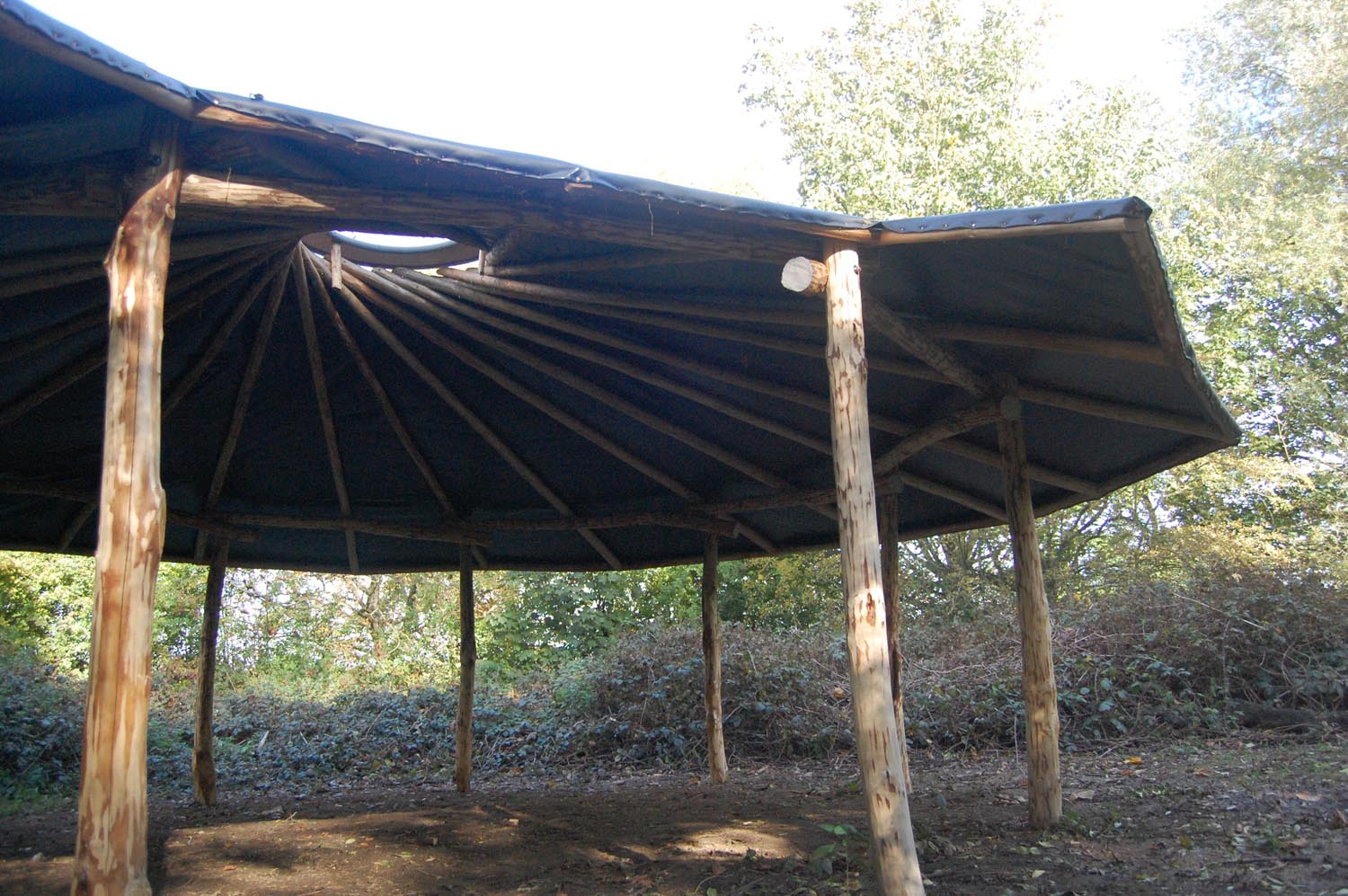
High frequency primary rafter design (Wholewoods)

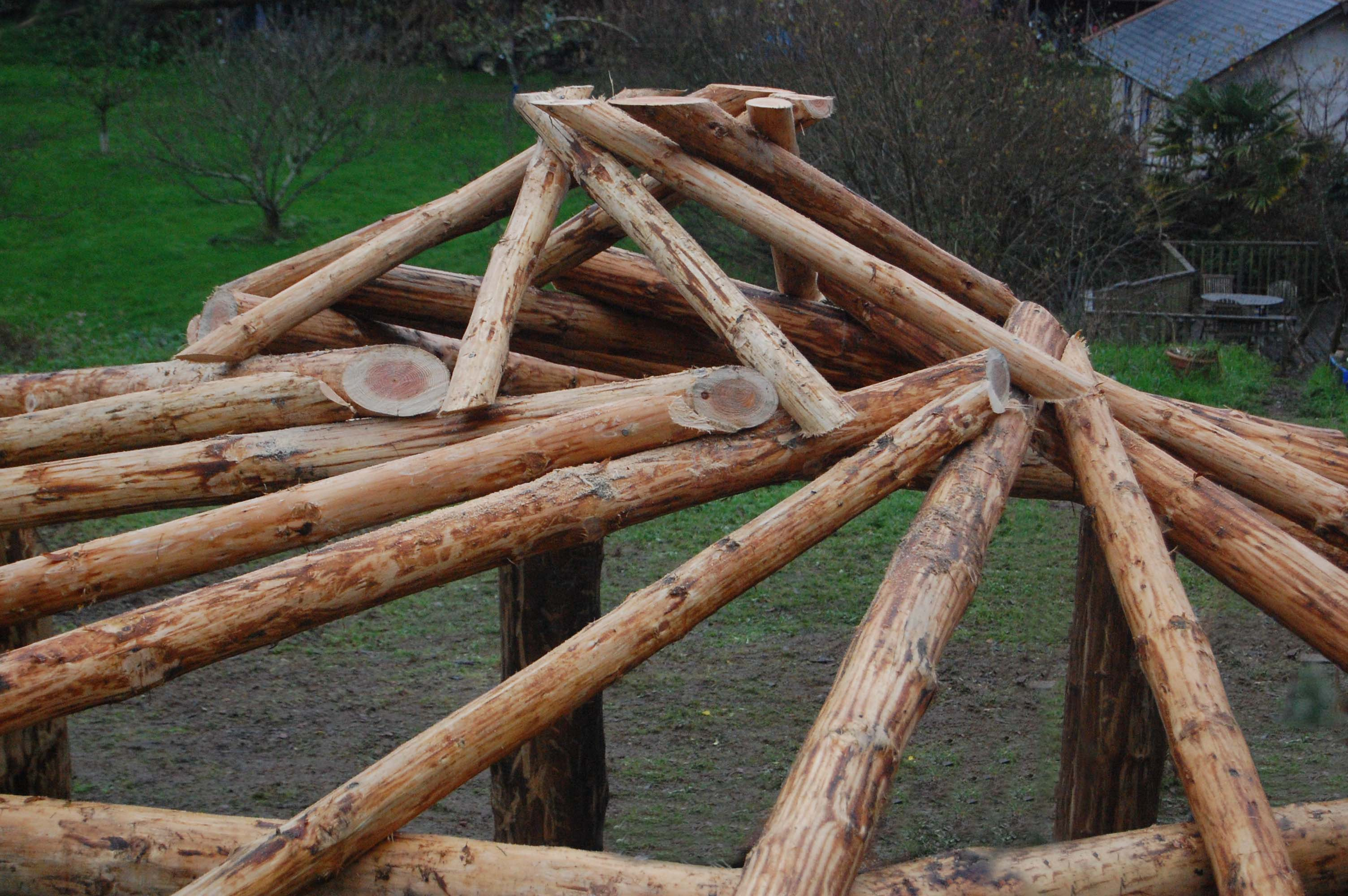
Secondary reciprocal design (Wholewoods)

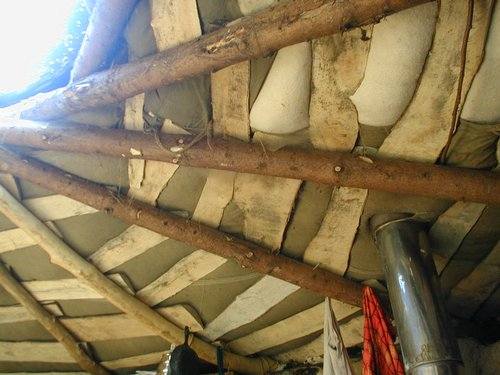

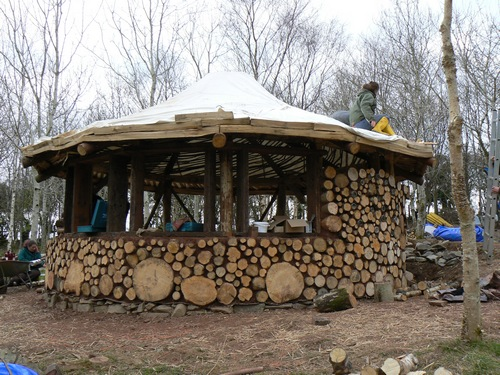

ReciproCalc: a reciprocal frame calculator.
