= Castell Henllys =

Castell Henllys Iron Age Fort
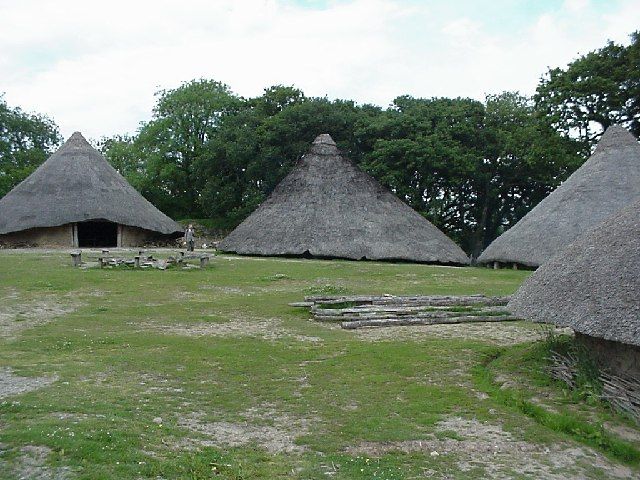

- Location within Wales
- Coordinates: 52.017°N 4.745°W
- Type: Archaeological open-air museum
- Website: Castell Henllys

Castell Henllys (Welsh, "castle of the old court") is an archaeological site near Nevern in north Pembrokeshire, Wales.

The Iron Age hillfort has been the subject of an ongoing excavation since the start of the 21st century, accompanied by an exercise in reconstruction archaeology whereby experiments in prehistoric farming have been practised. Four roundhouses and a granary have been reconstructed on their original Iron Age foundations – some 2,000 years old – the hillfort being the only site in Britain where this has been done. The Castell Henllys site includes significant earthworks and fortifications.

During the summer the site provides training for young archaeologists and is a popular visitor attraction. It is owned by Pembrokeshire Coast National Park.

== Gallery ==
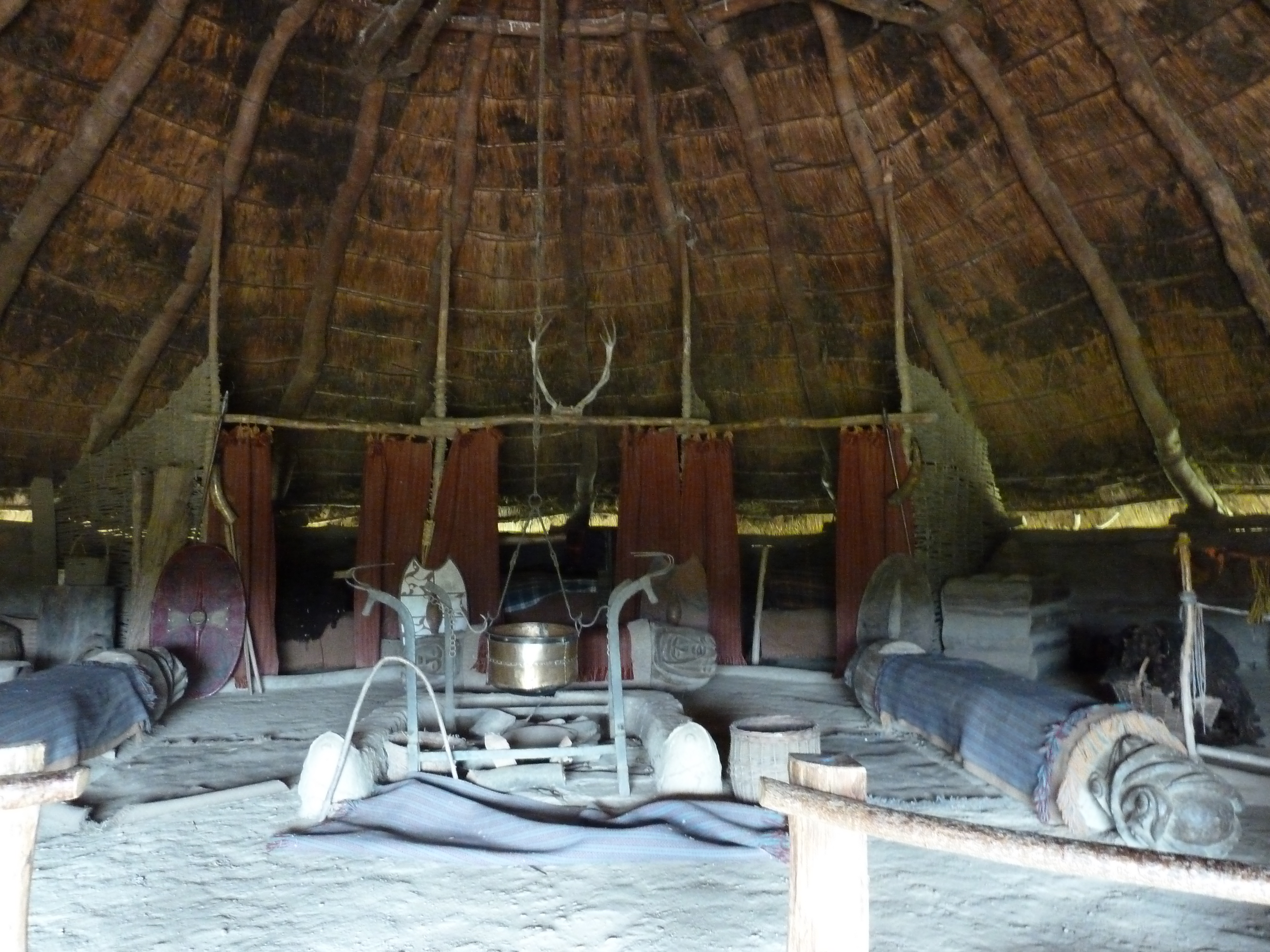
Interior of one of the reconstructed roundhouses

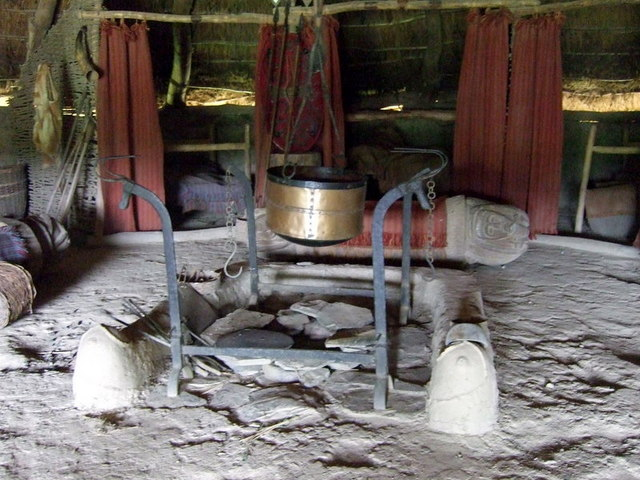
Interior

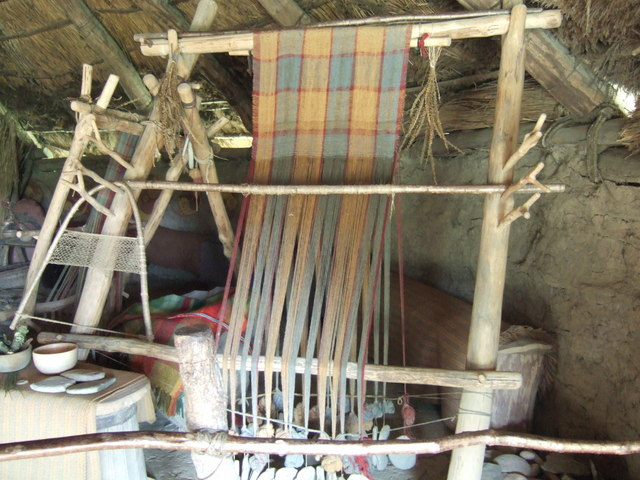
Interior

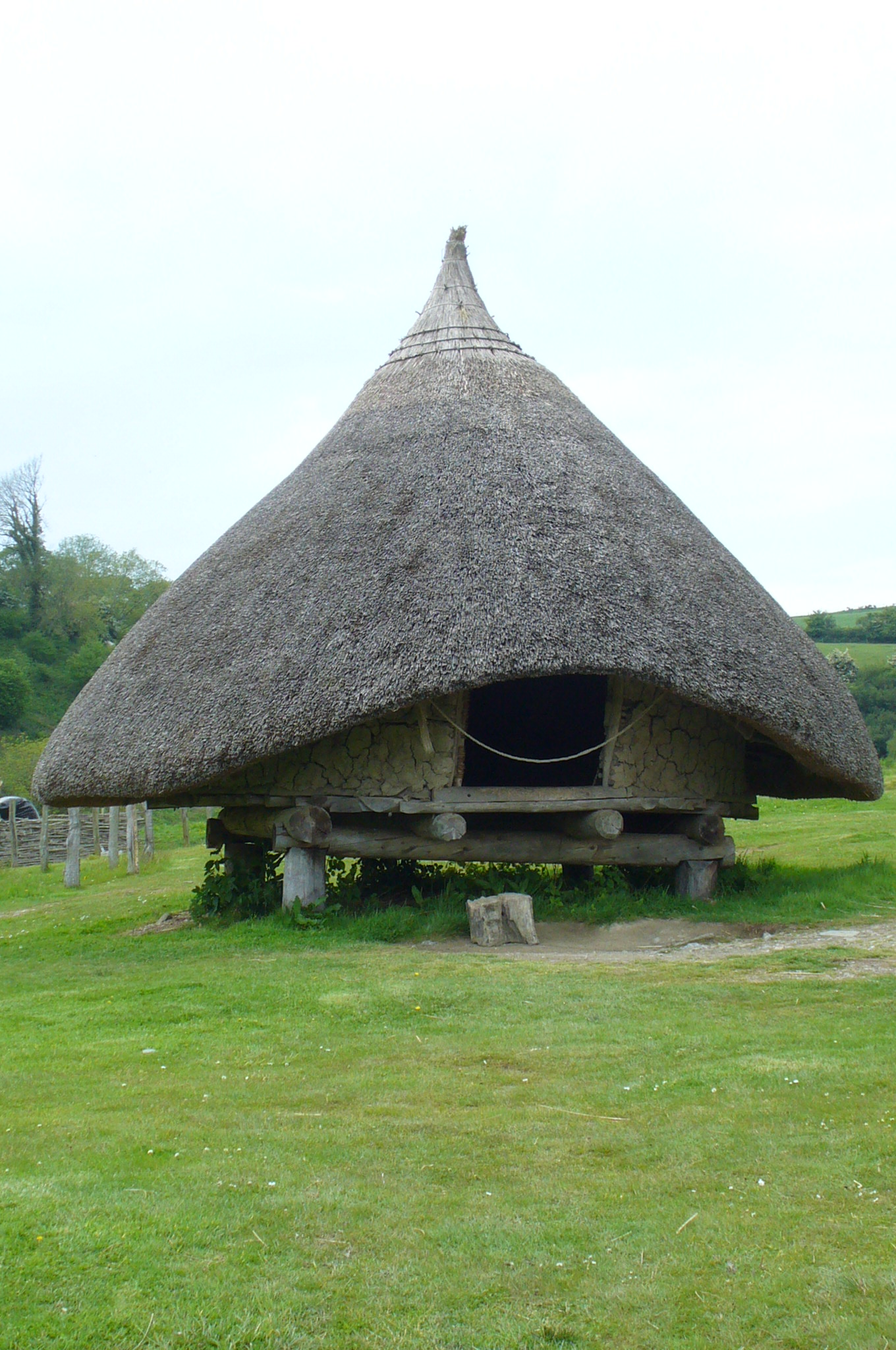
Reconstructed granary

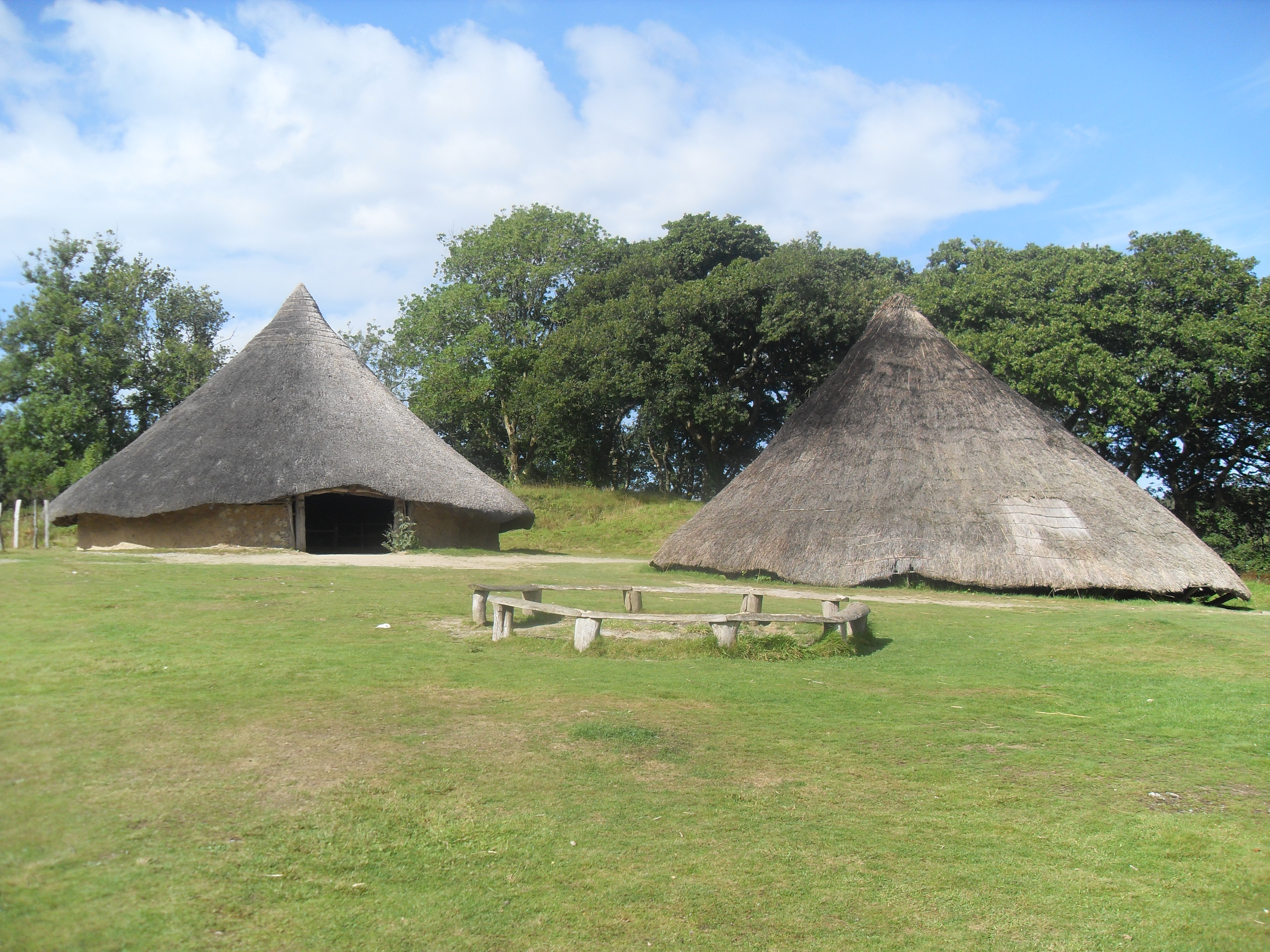

== See also ==
- List of hillforts in Wales
- Butser Ancient Farm
- Irish National Heritage Park
- Weald and Downland Living Museum
