= Pomona College Organic Farm =

Academic farm in Claremont, California

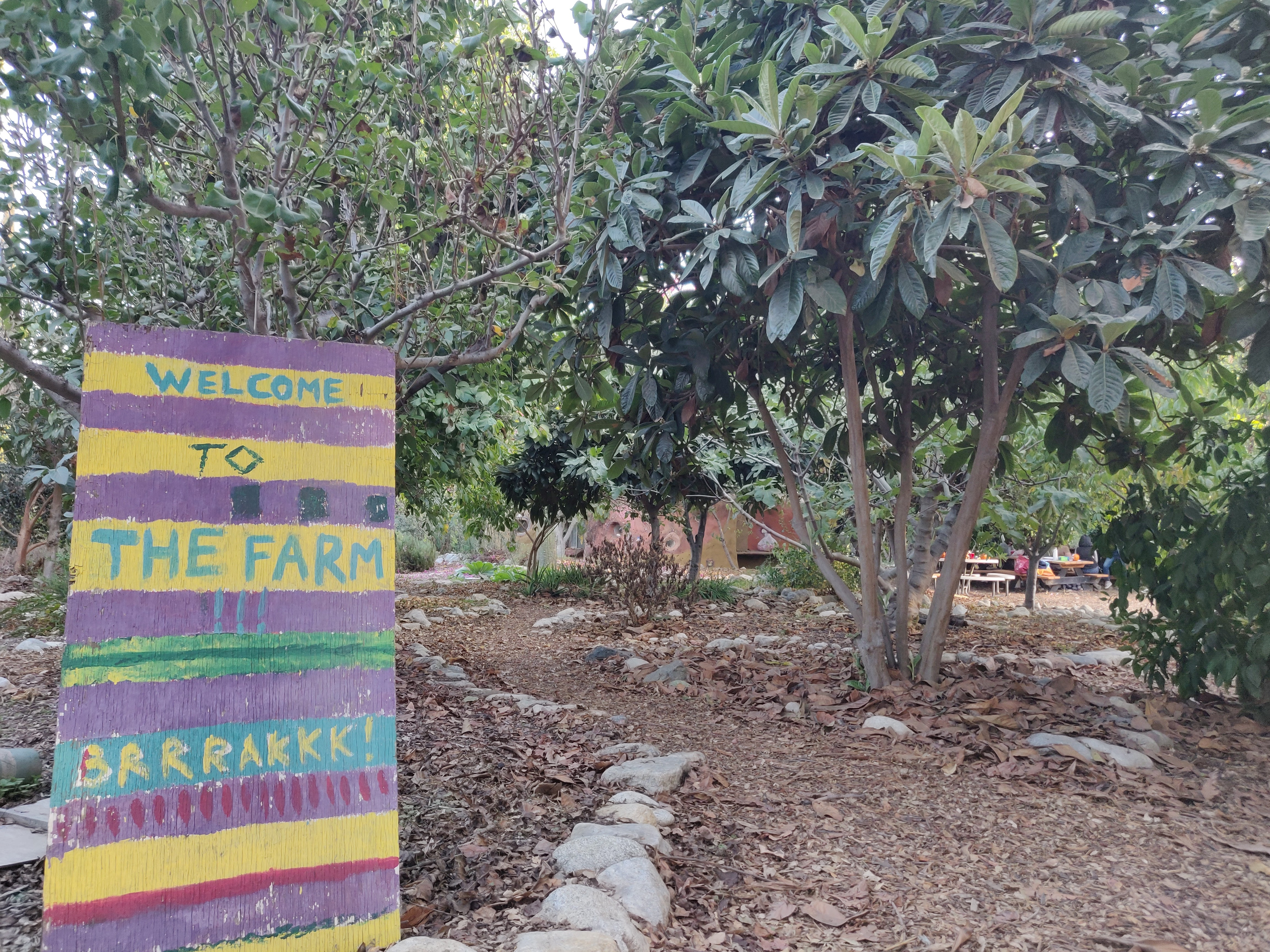
- Welcome sign on the West Farm

- Location within the Los Angeles metropolitan area Location within California
- Town/City: 295 E 1st St, Claremont, CA 91711
- Coordinates: 34.0956°N 117.7094°W
- Established: 1998; 28 years ago 2006; 20 years ago (since institutionalization)
- Area: 1.2 acres (0.49 ha)
- Website: www.pomona.edu/farm

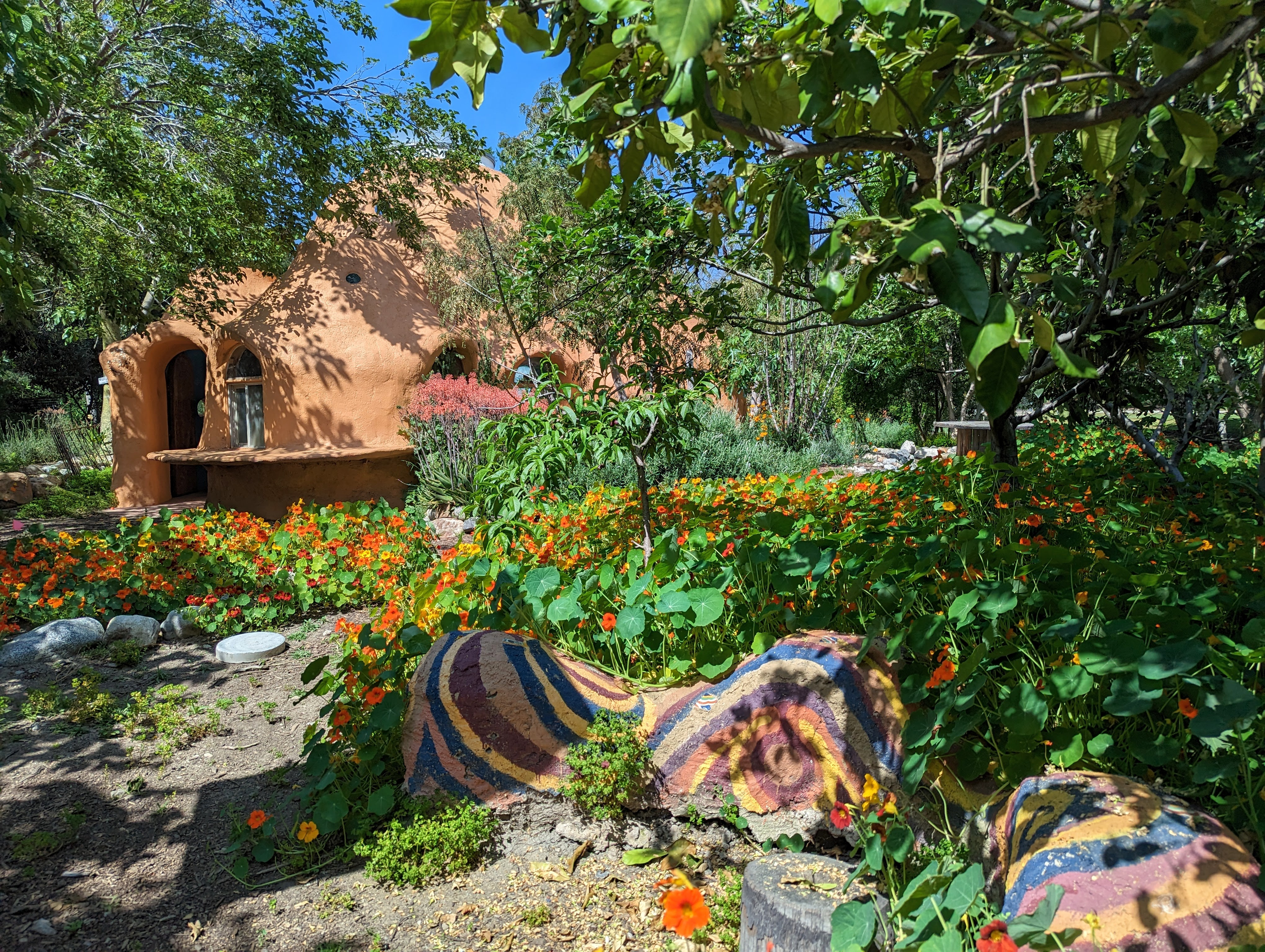
The West Farm near the Earth Dome

The Pomona College Organic Farm is an organic campus farm on 1.2 acres (0.49 ha) of the southeast corner of Pomona College's campus in Claremont, California. It is within Blanchard Park (more commonly known as "the Wash"). It was begun as an experimental permaculture project by a group of three friends in 1998, and was institutionalized in 2006.

== History ==
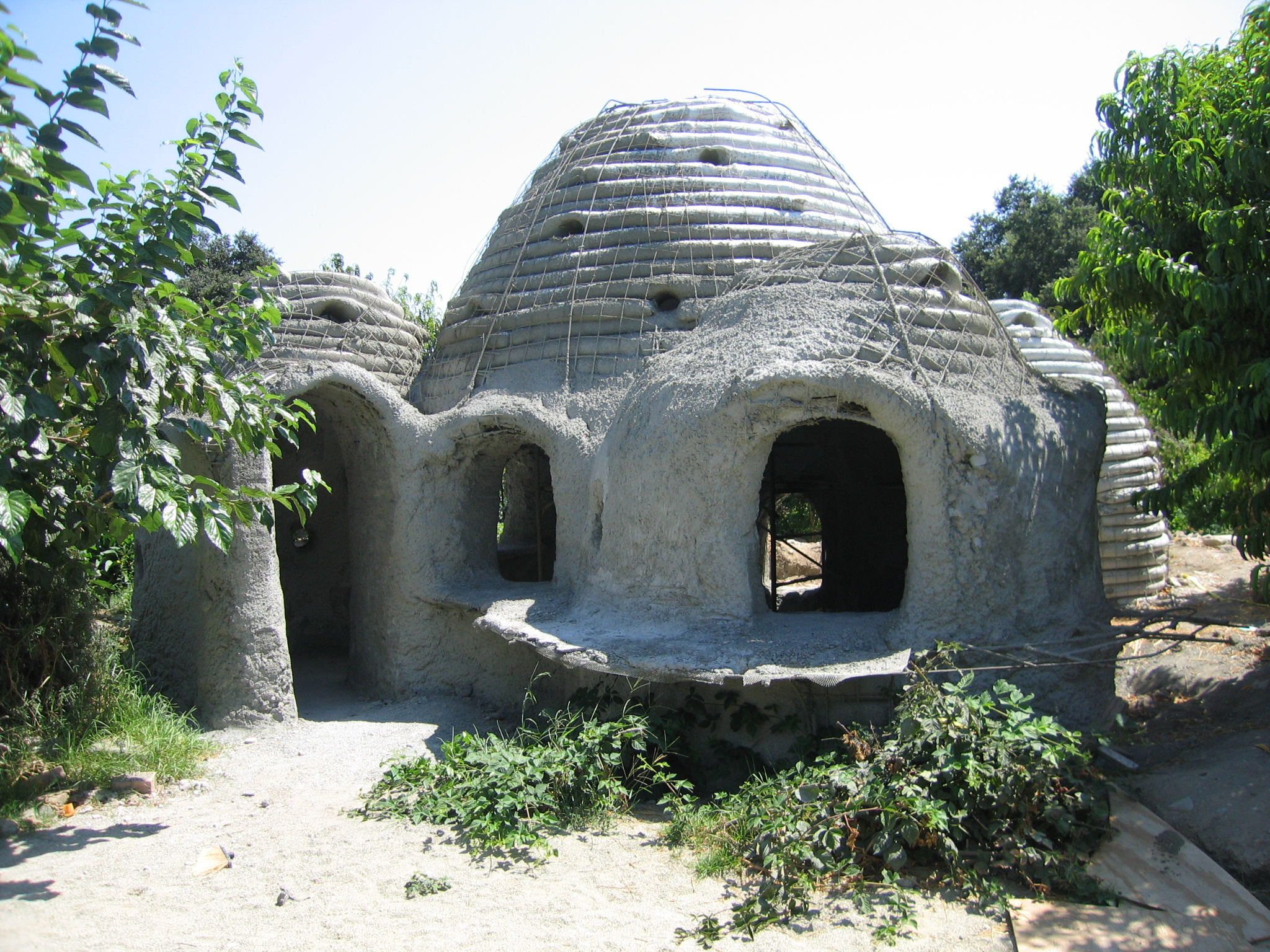
The Earth Dome II during construction in summer 2005

The farm was begun in 1998, when students began composting dining hall waste and planting crops in an unused portion of campus. Masanobu Fukuoka's book The One Straw Revolution provided the initial inspiration. One student remained on campus to tend to the farm over the summer, but, according to the farm's website, only a single tomato grew. Over the next few years, students from the "Gorilla Farming Club" worked to improve the nitrogen content of the soil and remove rocks.

During this time, the farm developed a reputation as an activist space, with extensive marijuana smoking, squatting, and other exploits. This, combined with the farm's unofficial status, led to strained relations with the college's administration. In 2002, students constructed an earth dome using Nader Khalili's superadobe designs, but the college demolished it at the start of the fall 2002 semester because of safety and permitting concerns. In April 2003, plans began for a new, institutionally-approved Earth Dome, which was completed in 2005. In May 2006, the farm and the college reached an agreement on rules for the farm, and it has since become institutionalized and expanded to include the East Farm.

== Layout ==
The farm occupies 1.2 acres (0.49 ha) of the far southeastern corner of Pomona College's campus, within the naturalistic portion of the campus known as "the Wash" (formally Blanchard Park). It is split into two halves, separated by the college's hammer throw field. The West Farm includes the superadobe Earth Dome, as well as a number of fruit trees, rock-lined student plots, an outdoor classroom, and a chicken coop. The East Farm has a 162-square-foot greenhouse and is used to grow crops and compost waste. A number of coast live oak trees dot the area.

== Operations ==
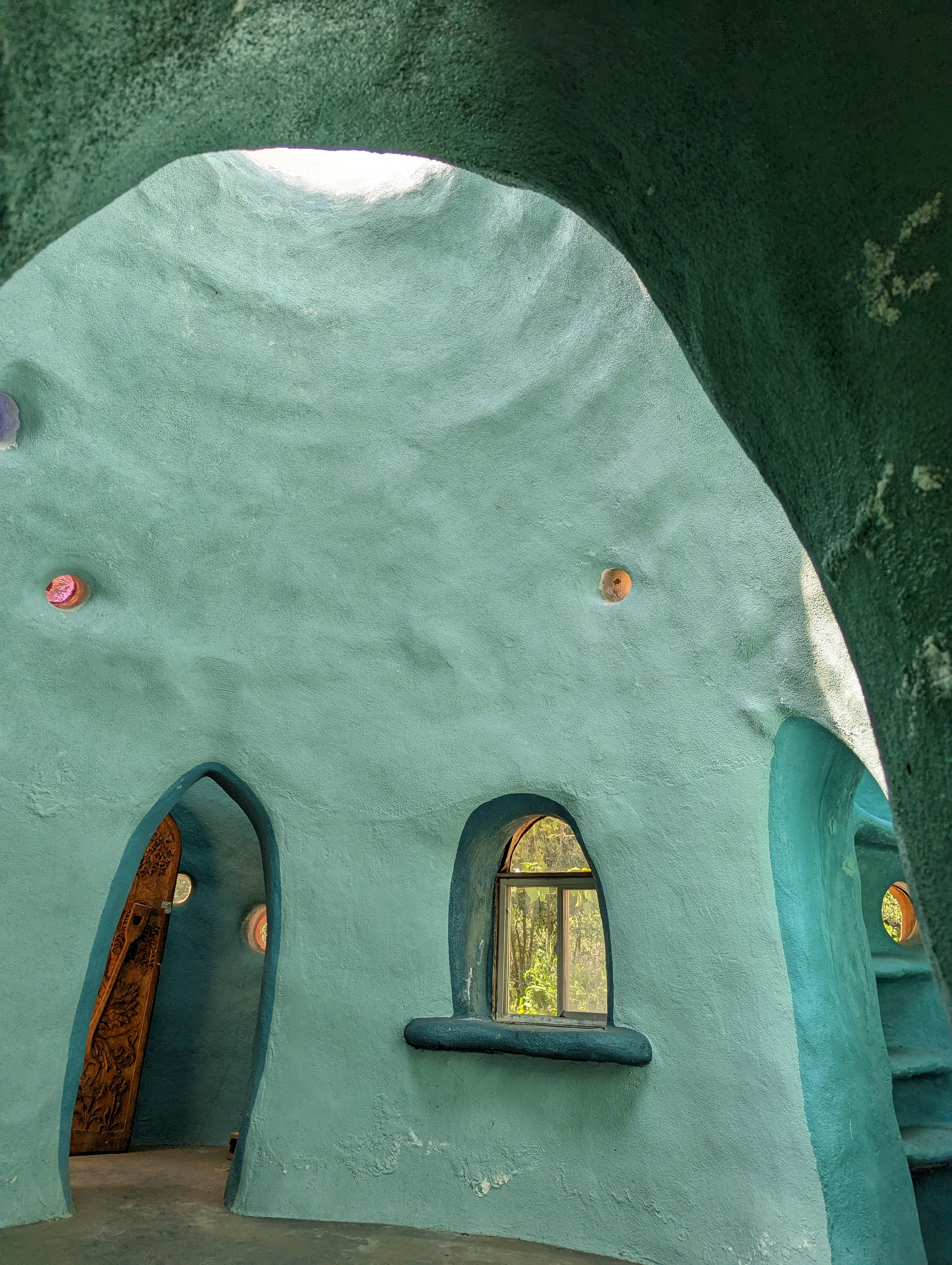
Earth Dome interior (view as a 360° interactive panorama)

The farm is predominantly run by students. It grows some of the food used in Pomona's dining halls, composts dining hall waste, operates a food stand, and facilitates a course on agriculture in the college's environmental analysis program.

It also hosts a number of events, including an annual "FarmFest", and provides a space for quiet retreat.

It is funded by proceeds from produce sales, the Associated Students of Pomona College, and the Environmental Analysis Department. Pomona alumnus Ronald Lee Fleming has also donated to the farm, funding a statue.

== Reception ==
A 2023 critique of campus farms in The Nation described the farm as "as visually appealing as it is functional" and highlighted its teaching function, but also questioned its non-native vegetation and water consumption.
