= Transitional shelter =

Temporary form of housing

Transitional shelters are designed to provide temporary housing and support services for individuals and families experiencing homelessness, with the goal of helping them transition into permanent housing. Unlike emergency shelters that focus on immediate and short-term relief, transitional shelters offer a more extended stay typically ranging from several months to up to two years. These shelters often cater to specific populations, such as women and children fleeing domestic violence, individuals recovering from addiction, or families working to regain financial stability. A key feature of transitional shelters is the integration of support services aimed at addressing the underlying causes of homelessness including case management, job training, educational support, mental health counseling, addiction treatment, and childcare.

Transitional shelters are often funded through a combination of federal, state, and local government programs, as well as private donations and grants. Programs like HUD's Continuum of Care (CoC) and Transitional Housing Assistance Grants support the development and operation of these facilities.

The term transitional shelter emerged in the mid-20th century as part of broader efforts to address homelessness and housing instability in the United States and globally. Initially, it was used to describe temporary housing solutions provided after major crises, such as wars or natural disasters, where displaced populations needed stable environments before transitioning to permanent homes. Unlike extended-stay refugee camps, which are often established to address long-term displacement due to ongoing conflict or lack of resettlement options, transitional shelters are designed with a defined timeline and the goal of facilitating a quicker integration into permanent housing.

In the 1980s, as homelessness rose in the U.S. due to economic recession, cuts to social services, and deinstitutionalization of mental health care, transitional shelters became a prominent component of federal housing strategies. The passage of the McKinney-Vento Homeless Assistance Act in 1987 formalized the concept, funding programs that combined temporary housing with supportive services to help individuals and families rebuild their lives. Since then, the term has evolved to encompass a wide range of programs aimed at addressing diverse causes of homelessness, such as domestic violence, addiction recovery, and economic instability. Today, transitional shelters are recognized as a critical step in the continuum of care for those experiencing homelessness, bridging the gap between emergency shelters and permanent housing solutions.

== See also ==
- Refugee shelter
- Emergency shelter
- Crisis accommodation
