= Mohamadreza Ghodousi =

Iranian architect (born 1976)

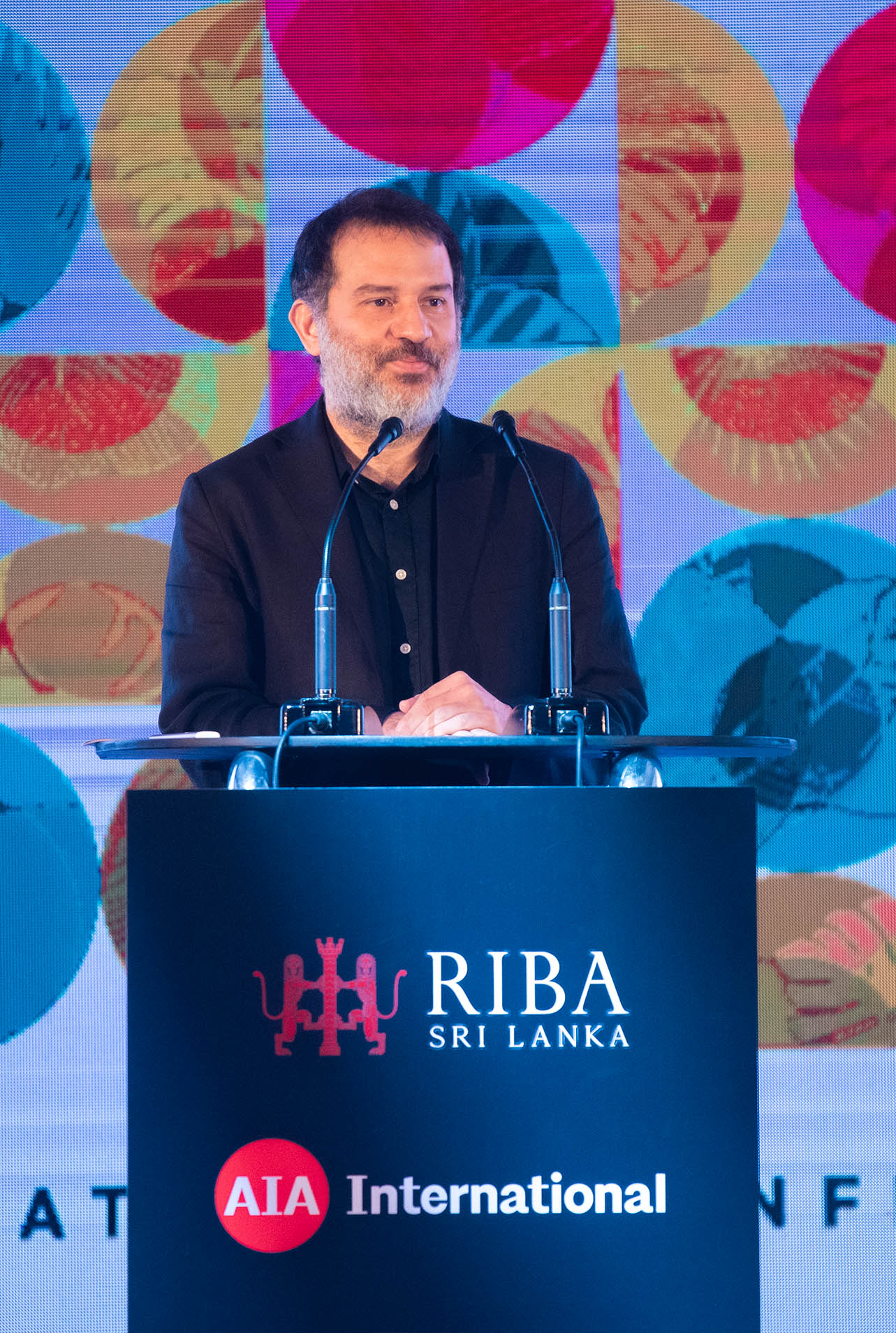
- Born: 1976 (age 49–50)
- Education: Shahid Beheshti University
- Occupation: Architect
- Awards: Aga Khan Award for Architecture, ArchDaily Building of the Year, AR New into Old, AR House Award, Dezeen Awards
- Practice: ZAV Architects
- Buildings: Majara Residence, Type-less Building, Pedari Guest House, Farsh Film Studio, Baba Beski's Tomb
- Website: https://zavarchitects.com/

Mohamadreza Ghodousi (Persian: محمدرضا قدوسی), also written as Mohamad Reza Ghodousi, is an Iranian architect. He is the co-founder and principal architect of the Tehran-based architectural practice ZAV Architects.

Ghodousi won the Aga Khan Award for Architecture in 2025 for the design of Majara Residence. His other notable works include Type-less Building, Habitat for Orphan Girls, Farsh Film Studio, Baba Beski Tomb, and Pedari Guest House.

== Background ==
Mohamadreza Ghodousi, born in 1976 in Tehran, studied architecture at Shahid Beheshti University from 1994 to 2001, where his master's thesis focused on the reconstruction of southern war-torn cities in southern Iran. This research shaped his architectural approach, emphasizing the importance of addressing local needs and adapting designs to resource constraints.

== Career ==
In 2006, Ghodousi and Parsa Ardam founded ZAV Architects, a practice centered on process-driven design that utilizes local resources and workforce to create adaptable and economically viable spaces. ZAV gained recognition in Iran’s alternative architectural scene with projects such as Habitat for Orphan Girls, Farsh Film Studio, and Rong Cultural Center, and later achieved international acclaim with the Majara Residence. The firm has completed projects across Iran, including on Hormuz Island, in Khansar, Gonbad-e Kavus, and Tehran.

In addition to his work with ZAV, Ghoddousi has contributed to Memar Magazine and teaches in architectural studios.

== Projects (Selected) ==
- Majara Residence
- Type-less Building
- Rong Cultural Center
- Farsh Film Studio
- Baba Beski Tomb
- Pedari Guest House
- Habitat for Orphan Girls

== Awards ==
- Aga Khan Award for Architecture (2025) for Majara Residence
- ArchDaily Building of the Year (2021), for Majara Residence
- AR New into Old (2021), for Farsh Film Studio
- Dezeen Awards (2019), for Rong Cultural Center
- AR House Awards (2018), for Habitat for Orphan Girls
