= Ceramic house =

Ceramic houses are buildings made of an earth mixture which is high in clay, and fired to become ceramic. The process of building and firing such houses was developed by Iranian architect Nader Khalili in the late 1970s; he named it Geltaftan. "Gel" means "clay" and "taftan" means "firing, baking, and weaving clay" in Persian language. Khalili's research into creating ceramic houses was strongly based on the idea that permanent, water-resistant, and earthquake-resistant houses could be built with the implementation of the four elements: earth and water to build the forms, and fire and air to finish them. His impassioned work led to a few small scale projects in Iran, including the Javadabad Elementary School, and the Ghaled Mofid restoration project. Aside from Khalili's own documented work, there seems to be little widespread research on ceramic houses.

== History of the Geltaftan method ==
After having a successful architectural practice in Iran and USA, Nader Khalili's interests turned to rural desert Iran exploring appropriate technology for poor people. While there, Khalili observed how the oldest buildings around were the village kilns, and that their durability came from the fact that the adobe bricks they were made from had been fired in the pottery making process, and therefore hardened. It took years of bureaucratic entanglement, a massive earthquake, and a revolution to get his ideas implemented. In 1978, Khalili, working with a kiln specialist, rehabilitated twelve houses in the village of Ghaled Mofid in a rural area outside Tehran, Iran. By firing and glazing the homes they became more permanent and safe places for the villagers to live. In 1981, Khalili completed a ten-classroom school of ceramic earth architecture in Javadabad, Iran.

In 1984 Khalili, who had moved to California by that time, proposed to NASA that ceramic houses be built on the moon. Experiments were conducted by Khalili at McDonnell Douglas Space Systems laboratories to show how harnessing the sun could melt and fuse lunar soil into shapes and forms for building applications. A full-scale model of the proposed colony was intended to be built in the desert outside of Hesperia, CA, where Khalili established his training school: the Cal-Earth Institute. The research received mixed reactions. Khalili was known as "quite a visionary" and thought of as "before his time" by, among others, the mayor of Hesperia, Jim Lindley. Only a few prototypes were built. In 1986 the Geltaftan Foundation was established by Khalili in California for further research into earth architecture. Each of his projects achieved moderate publicity, but Khalili's geltaftan technology has seen little use since the 1980s. This is in part because of the pollution involved in oil firing. The Geltaftan Foundation, and Cal-Earth has since carried on experiments with ceramic housing, but Nader Khalili is most noted today for his work developing Super Adobe: an earth building technique using earth-filled bags as structural elements.

== Building and firing ==
The earth used for building ceramic houses is essentially a type of adobe with a higher clay content and fewer impurities. The earth and water are mixed until the substance has "the consistency of bread dough". The clay/earth mixture is worked into forms, and the blocks dry over a period of one to two weeks. A mortar is made with a "flux" (glass, soda, or colemanite) to help fuse it.

The adobe blocks are laid so that the joints are staggered. There is no mortar in the vertical joints to allow for expansion and contraction during firing. Rammed Earth and Mud Pile can also be fired, but must be fired from both sides because of the thickness of the walls. Building with stiff wet mud, like a potter, allows for thinner walls, and the possibility of incorporating flue systems into the walls. Arches can be formed by stacking non mortared blocks as form work, and removing them after firing.

The firing system used is based on the availability of fuel and local know how. In Iran, village kilns used oil for fuel, so a simple, gravity flow oil burner could be used to fire each room. Flues are created (either integrated into the structural, or made for removal) and openings are closed with un-mortared brick. Joints are covered with a thin layer of mud plaster. The burner is placed at a low opening with room for air circulation, but protected from wind.

During the early stages of firing, 200–900 °C (392–1,652 °F) water vapor escapes through the flues located on the roof. Once the steam escapes, roof flues can be closed and heat will circulate the room before escaping from floor vents. This is when the room is heated to at least 1,000 °C (1,830 °F) and the adobe is baked. After the firing, only the ceiling flues are opened to allow slow cooling over at least 48 hours.

The outside walls are finished with either a mud straw plaster, fired brick, or ceramic tile. When finished with mud straw plaster, a thin layer of clay earth and straw is baked on to the structure at the end phase of firing, and a second layer of the plaster troweled on after cooling. When finished with tiles, they are mortared directly over a waterproofing layer such as tar.

== Forms and techniques ==
The primary shapes of a ceramic building, are squares and rectangles with roofs that are arches, vaults, and domes. This is in order to construct the entire structure of monolithic material (cost effectiveness) and also to achieve the tremor resistance and proven longevity of a shell membrane.

Adobe and clay can be sculpted into built-in forms and structures, such as seats and shelving, and fired with the rest of the house.

Adding oxides and different types of sand and clay can create different finishes. The most important mineral oxide in glazing is silica (which makes glass). Low fired glazes are preferable for houses. Glazing should only be done in some places to allow for a room's skin to "breathe." Glazes have even been made with recycled glass bottles. Salt glazing is another way to make an inexpensive finish.

== Benefits ==
There are many potential benefits to firing an earthen house. Firing makes a clay structure water resistant. Ceramic kilns often outlive the earth constructed buildings they are close to. The materials for this type of building are accessible to those with very basic resources. Fuel for firing is the most expensive investment. The hardened membrane of a ceramic dome improves resistance to earthquakes. The structure of a ceramic house improves passive heat use through thermal mass. Added benefits involving the firing process include the opportunity to produce other ceramic goods for use or income, and, when firing an existing house, pest evacuation will occur naturally.

== Examples ==
Experimental fired earth housing has also been constructed using the principles of an ancient Chinese anagama kiln. In the anagama kiln system, a wood fire is built at the base of a slope, and the gases are drawn by a strong draft up the slope through a tunnel. When a dome is constructed at the end of the tunnel out of clay, the hot gases bake the clay structure to ceramic hardness.

== See also ==
- Earthbag construction
- Adobe
- Appropriate Technology
- Mudbrick
- Rammed Earth
- Anagama kiln
