= Crisis accommodation =

Living arrangements for homeless people

Crisis accommodation, also called temporary accommodation, is housing provided to people experiencing temporary or ongoing challenges with safety, finances, or health. It aims to remove them from an otherwise harmful environment and allowing them to improve their situations from a safe and stable environment. Situations that may be alleviated through crisis accommodation include but are not limited to homelessness, domestic violence, elder abuse, and child abuse.

Unlike emergency shelters that focus on immediate and short-term relief, transitional shelters offer a more extended stay typically ranging from several months to up to two years. These shelters often cater to specific populations, such as women and children fleeing domestic violence, individuals recovering from addiction, or families working to regain financial stability. A key feature of transitional shelters is the integration of support services aimed at addressing the underlying causes of homelessness including case management, job training, educational support, mental health counseling, addiction treatment, and childcare.

Crisis accommodation is typically provided through government organisations, not-for-profit organisations and charities - with for-profit models in certain contexts also playing a smaller provisioning role. In some policy contexts, crisis accommodation is funded through housing subsidies or related assistance programmes; however, these terms are not synonymous. There are other factors such as availability of the services and reasons like poverty and accumulation of debt that affect homelessness which needs to be taken into account in order to solve it as more people tend to look for urgent support when they are facing this crisis.

Transitional shelters are often funded through a combination of federal, state, and local government programs, as well as private donations and grants. Programs like HUD's Continuum of Care (CoC) and Transitional Housing Assistance Grants support the development and operation of these facilities.

Crisis housing or temporary accommodation contrasts with emergency and homeless shelters, which is often provided to those made homeless on a shorter term basis, though the lines between these three is often blurred depending on the jurisdiction studied.

== Causes ==
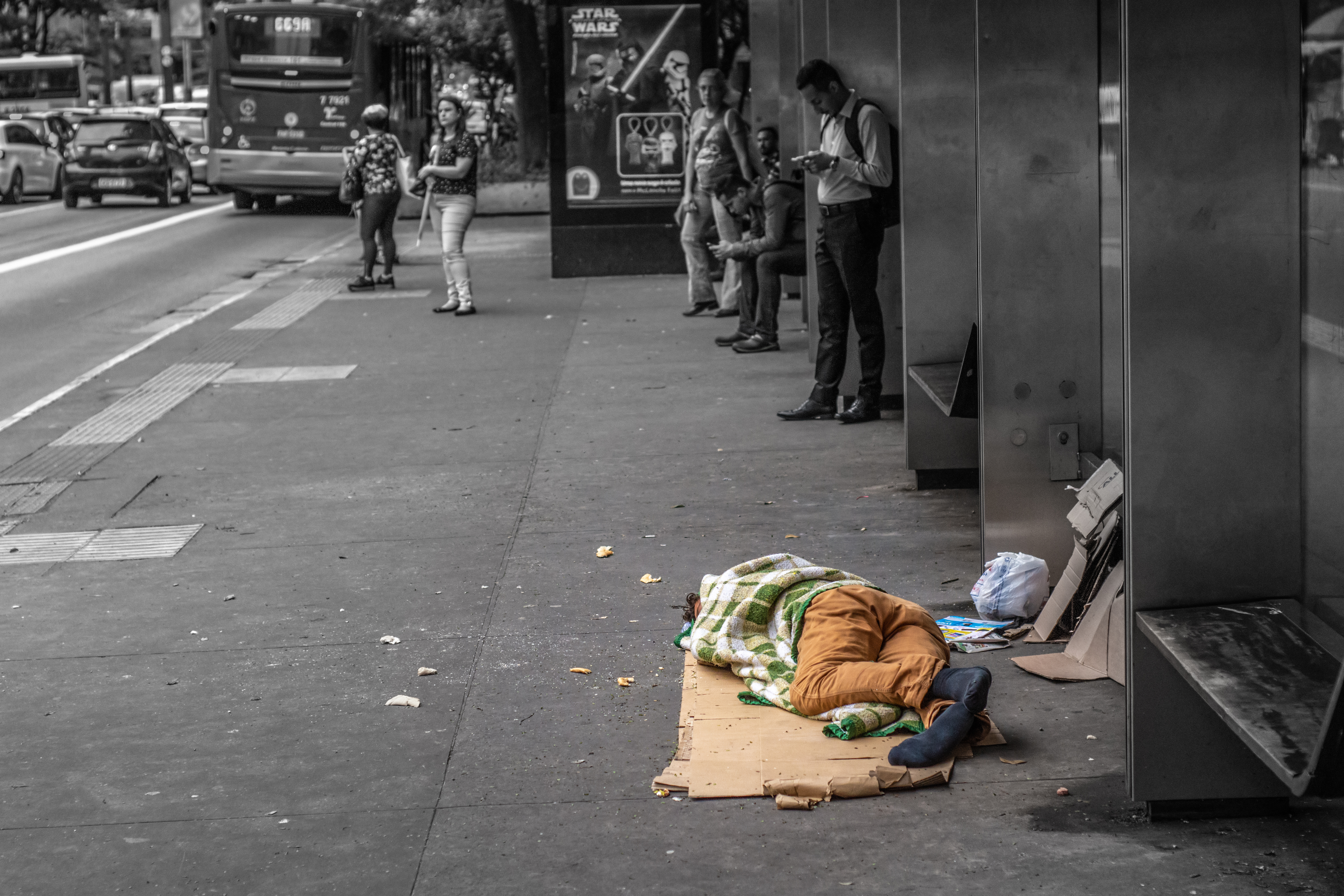
Homeless and poor man sleeping on the street.

Because crisis/temporary accommodation is made available to those at risk of having to rough sleep, the causes largely overlap with the causes of homelessness.

The major problems that cause people require crisis accommodation in high-income countries include:

- Mental disorders
- Having to leave home to escape domestic violence
- Poverty
- Substance abuse disorders
- No accommodation immediately available to adults who are leaving foster care, prisons, or psychiatric hospitals

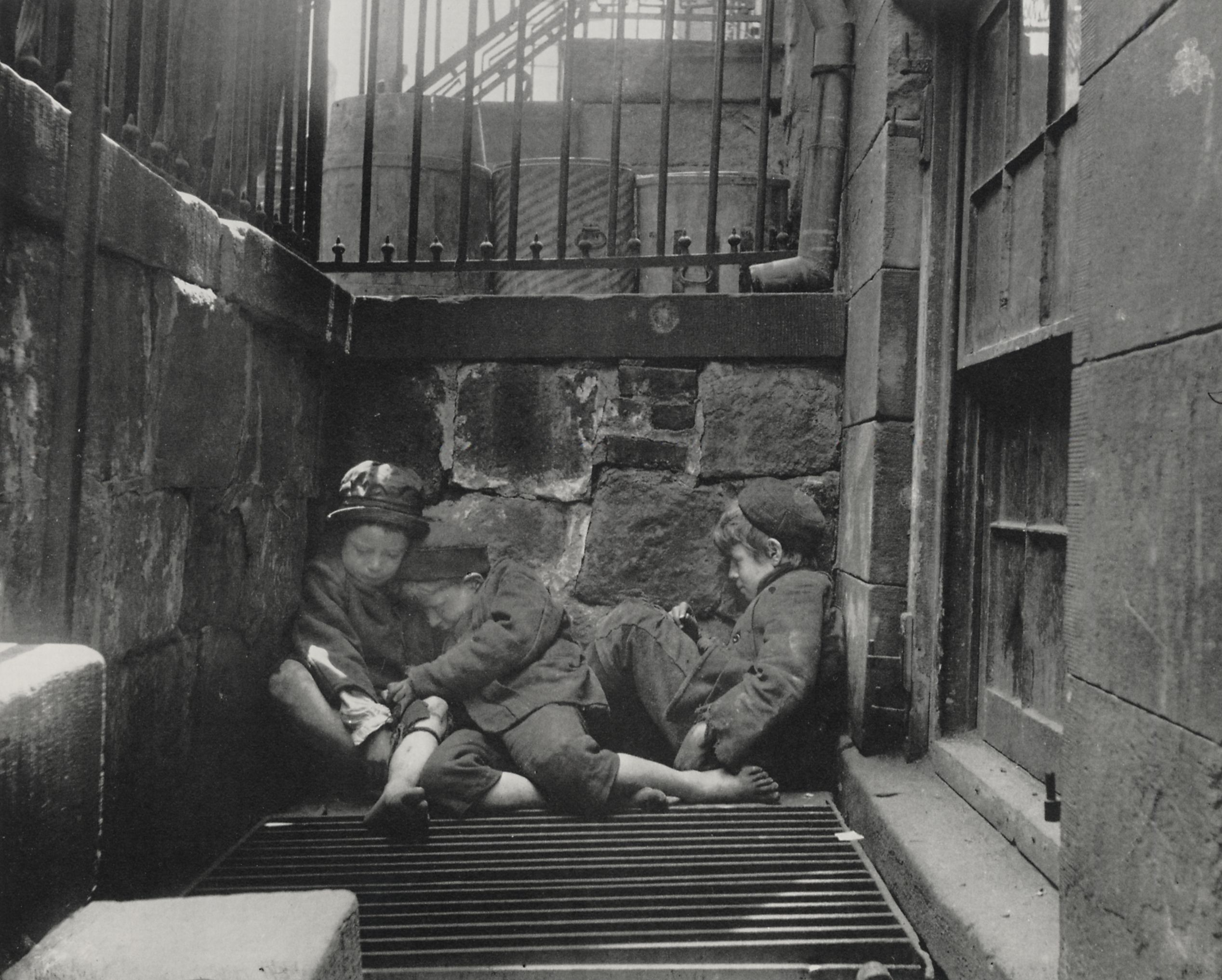
Homeless children sleeping under the stairs outdoor.

It is evident that people who end up sleeping rough or in precarious housing often have faced one or more of these issues, and had delays or gaps in receiving support. Homelessness can also co-occur with inability to pay debts, family conflicts, broken families, or any types of abuse or violence. Besides that, domestic violence is involved in deteriorating relationships which eventually causes the victims to run away from their houses to look for alternative accommodation services. Due to the lack of temporary accommodation in certain places, those victims are left with no choice but to return to the violent relationships. Leaving these victims to return to such situations may affect them in many other negative ways especially towards young children. Poverty is a cause of homelessness and such situations occur when a person or individual has little money, accumulation of financial debt, lack of education and many more. These circumstances cause people to lose their houses and also the right to tenancy and hence they become homeless. Emotional problems among young children may arise due to substances abuse problem like consuming drugs and alcohol. These young children will be affected mentally and physically as they become depressed and aggressive. These causes will lead individuals to seek for support and services like crisis accommodation to have a place to live in and also to ensure they are not homeless.

== History ==
The term transitional shelter emerged in the mid-20th century as part of broader efforts to address homelessness and housing instability in the United States and globally. Initially, it was used to describe temporary housing solutions provided after major crises, such as wars or natural disasters, where displaced populations needed stable environments before transitioning to permanent homes. Unlike extended-stay refugee camps, which are often established to address long-term displacement due to ongoing conflict or lack of resettlement options, transitional shelters are designed with a defined timeline and the goal of facilitating a quicker integration into permanent housing.

In the 1980s, as homelessness rose in the U.S. due to economic recession, cuts to social services, and deinstitutionalization of mental health care, transitional shelters became a prominent component of federal housing strategies. The passage of the McKinney-Vento Homeless Assistance Act in 1987 formalized the concept, funding programs that combined temporary housing with supportive services to help individuals and families rebuild their lives. Since then, the term has evolved to encompass a wide range of programs aimed at addressing diverse causes of homelessness, such as domestic violence, addiction recovery, and economic instability. Today, transitional shelters are recognized as a critical step in the continuum of care for those experiencing homelessness, bridging the gap between emergency shelters and permanent housing solutions.

== Challenges ==
Providing crisis accommodation or temporary accommodation may help reduce homelessness but it takes a lot of effort, time, resources and also other factors to accomplish their goals. These challenges are faced by the government, non-government agencies and the homeless people involved. One of the main challenges faced by the homeless people is there is a severe lack in resources. Typically, these homeless victims search for services like crisis accommodation as they do not have adequate resources to move into their own houses or to sustain their living standards. Temporary accommodation may be limited and not cater for a large number of people. Therefore, it requires a lot of effort and time from the victims in terms of application for these accommodations as many people would have applied for it the same time. Due to the lack of resources and housing options, some victims may experience social isolation by being distant from their preferred area. This add on the challenge by creating a greater duress on families which eventually will affect their mental health in terms of depression and stress. Hence, victims are exposed to violence and inappropriate behaviour. Younger children are affected as the environment is not suitable for them as their play and development opportunities become restricted, and more friction is placed on school attendance.

Homeless victims may feel unsafe in the houses provided to them because of the poor facilities and will be demoralised by their surrounding environment crisis. In some accommodations, they cater many people in a house and consumers especially women, are uncomfortable with it and they feel difficult and unsafe. Sharing is also a challenge to most victims as they find it difficult of being close or forced to interact with their house or roommates. Different victims have different preferences and needs which contradicts between the requirements of rational provision of services and the inmate demands. This lowers their self-esteem and confidence level which eventually causes them to isolate themselves in their respective rooms. Generally, women show lower self-esteems compared to men in these situations.

The provision of temporary accomodations requires substantial investment from both government and non-government agencies Financial support becomes crucial and increases over time as it becomes concentrated at one place. It is difficult to solve homelessness as it requires big amount of resources, time for planning and effort to make it work. It is crucial and important for them because other issues or homelessness may arise if they do not take immediate action.

In circumstances where public housing faces funding cuts, a lack of affordable housing makes private rental unviable and unsustainable for many cases, for those who are supported to exit homelessness, even when a government subsidy for said private rental is supplied.

== Assistance and resources ==
In crisis accommodation, assistance and resources may be provided through publicly funded systems and delivered by non-government organisations, including support to help people stabilise their situation and move toward longer-term housing

Some agencies work with the aim of providing assistance with improving the living standards of homeless people, and with opportunities to become independent. The goal of providing housing options is to ensure the safety of people, regardless of their gender. These housing options allow the victims to learn a set of skills so that they are able to maintain their homes. Legal supports like provision of police powers and provision of SHLV (Staying Home Leaving Violence) schemes are provided through these assistance programs to those whom are in need.

Safe at Home scheme is integrated in Australia by the government and non-governmental agencies to support the homeless people. Programs are provided to homeless people to raise community awareness and educate them on children's homelessness, domestic and family violence, and boost their awareness about mental health. The State of Victoria uses Housing Establishment Funds (HEFs) provided through agency referrals to alleviate difficulties in paying for rent or basic services. There are also schemes provided by non-government agencies to reduce homelessness and help prevent the use of crisis accommodation. These housing options provide advocacy and support services to help people improve their amenities and opportunities.

== As a way to reduce unsheltered homelessness ==
Many governments and service systems frame homelessness reduction and improved living standards as key policy goals. Providing temporary accommodation to the homeless people is a way of reducing rough sleeping but it is not a permanent solution. Homelessness reduction typically involves coordinated roles for governments, service providers, communities, and often wider public participation. Services like this and access to regular and permanent housing are offered to avoid people from sleeping on streets and risking their lives from any domestic violence or abuse. A coordinated responses from different organisations can involve increased public spending on rental housing assistance and placing greater emphasis on service sectors in order to reduce homelessness.

Some programmes incorporate monitoring and case management intended to improve safety and access to basic needs and health services, with the eventual aim of moving participants into sustainable long-term housing.

Where the supply of crisis accommodation is critically low, agencies are sometimes forced to use less adequate accommodation, such as inns or hotels, with worse conditions and lower long-term outcomes (where the otherwise-unsheltered individuals have less likelihood of moving into sustainable long-term housing).

Family reconciliation would be an effective way in order to help support the homeless people especially younger children and those victims of higher risks like domestic violence, child abuse or elder abuse. Due to the lack of temporary accommodation in certain countries, some homeless people are given financial assistance so that they are able to secure an alternative accommodation if they are not accepted in any of these crisis accommodation services. It becomes much easier to supervise the victim's behaviour, health and personal contacts to ensure their safety.

More affordable opportunities are and should be given to low income homeless people by allowing the government to work together with the housing market agencies. This will help improve the residential stability of the homeless victims. Providing an affordable, safe and comfortable environment to the homeless people should be taken into account and given more priorities. Adequate provision of good facilities and services should be prioritised in all the temporary accommodation for a better and healthy living. Legal and judicial measures are taken into account in order to keep these homeless victims safe from any high risk, violence and evictions. Certain ideal systems or standards should be set for those whom are accepted into the temporary accommodations.

== Reducing the demand for crisis accommodation ==
More alternative pathways into affordable housing may be possible in some cases.

The Melbourne Apartment Project and Toronto's Options for Homes Scheme helps create space in the public housing by encouraging and helping victims to buy their own homes. These programmes are assessed to provide psychological benefits, in terms of safety and comfort.

Wider solutions to the housing crisis (one cause of homelessness) are also discussed: Paul Johnson, director of the Institute for Fiscal Studies, writing in The Times and commenting on the housing crisis in the United Kingdom, called for a mixture of changes to policies (tax, housing, welfare) along with increased housebuilding in both social and private sectors.

Subsidised housing can be an effective way of addressing some causes of homelessness, particularly as it relates to affordability.

== See also ==
- Refugee shelter
- Emergency shelter
- Transitional shelter
