= Demonstration farm =

Farm used to research or demonstrate agriculture

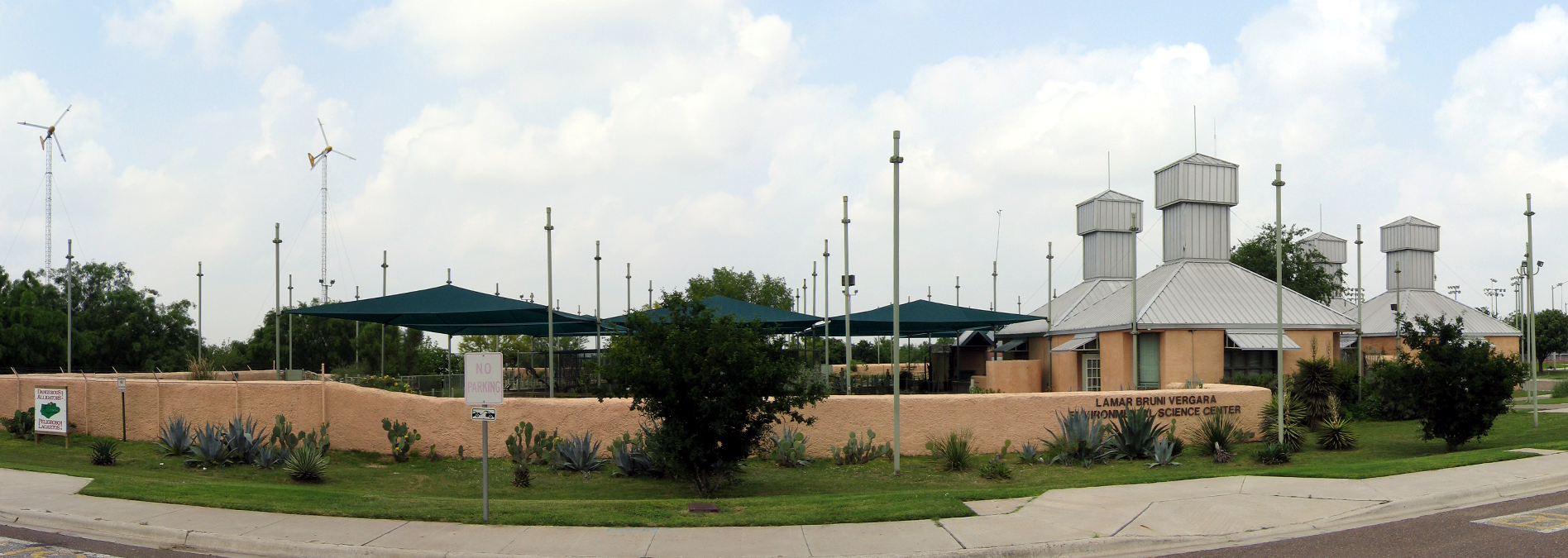
Laredo Demonstration Farm

A demonstration farm, experimental farm or model farm, is a farm which is used primarily to research or demonstrate various agricultural techniques, with any economic gains being an added bonus. Demonstration farms are often owned and operated by educational institution or government ministries. It is also common to rent land from a local farmer. The leaser is allowed to perform their demonstrations, while the land owner can be paid for the land usage or may be given the resulting crops.

Many demonstration farms not only have crops, but may also have various types of livestock. Various techniques for feeding and bedding are tested on these farms. Demonstration farms run by universities are not only used for research, but are also used for teaching purposes. The Ontario Agricultural College operates a demonstration farm in which students take active participation in their classes.

There has also been an expanding number of demonstration farms which are used to test various forms of renewable energy, primarily wind turbines and solar panels.

Model farms became popular during the Industrial Age, providing education to urbanized populations and encouraging improved welfare standards for agricultural workers. Farm buildings were designed to be beautiful as well as utilitarian, inspired by the ideals of the enlightenment.

== History ==
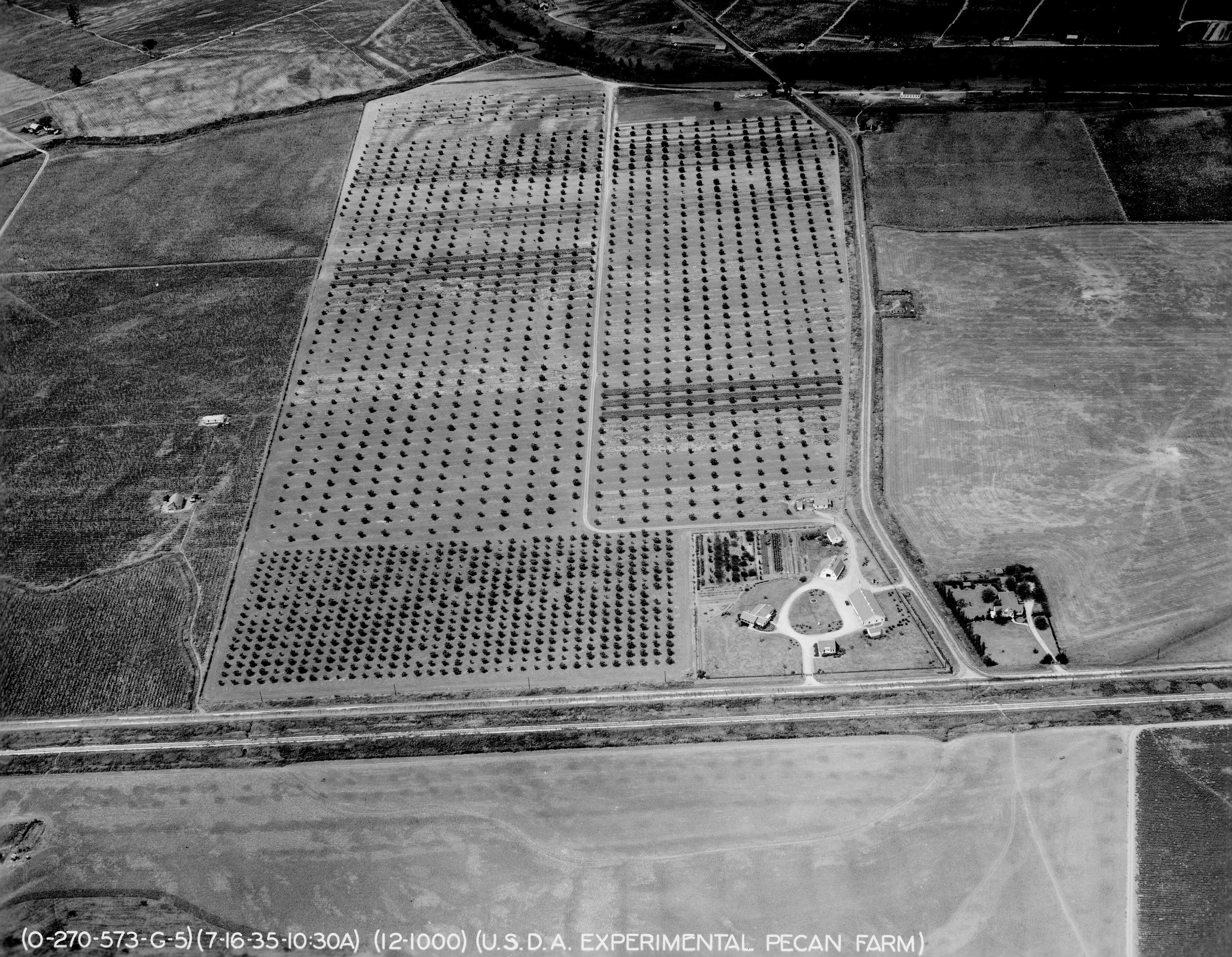
An experimental pecan farm by the U.S. Department of Agriculture in Louisiana, 1935

=== Hofwyl: early example of a model farm ===
In the nineteenth century, a combined effect of population pressure and the scientific revolution drove Western Europe to consider a fundamental revolution in agricultural training and practice. A number of prominent European agricultural experts, including the agricultural secretary of Scotland and famous agriculturalist Arthur Young, argued for the creation of institutions dedicated to agricultural experimentation. One attempt to introduce scientific approach to agriculture was the formation of ‘model farms’ across Europe. These farms served as experimental models, in which to develop and experiment with husbandry practices and technology.

One of the most well-reputed and long-lasting model farms was Hofwyl, an estate near the Swiss city of Bern. In 1799, Philipp Emanuel von Fellenberg purchased 250 acres of land and over the next forty years, created five establishments on his model farm, which he named Hofwyl. An agriculturist by trade and a moral reformer at heart, he sought to establish agricultural educational institutions dedicated to both scientific approach to agriculture and reconnecting individuals of all social classes to the land. His two most celebrated schools, the Scientific Educational Institution for the Higher Social Classes (1806) and the Poor School (1810) garnered attention and visitors from all over Europe and the United States.

Through the establishment of an institution dedicated to the discipline of agricultural experimentation, improvement, and innovation, Fellenberg hoped to elevate his students’ minds and improve society in general. He divided his pupils between two aforementioned institutions: the sons of rich gentlemen and affluent landowners, and those of the poor and vagrants. The Scientific Educational Institution for the Higher Social Classes provided rigorous academic and practical training in scientific disciplines deemed useful in agricultural studies, such as mathematics, chemistry, and natural history, while the Poor school sought to instill its less fortunate students with skills and manual training necessary for agricultural operations. The former group followed a rigorous schedule from 5 a.m. to 10 p.m., covering not only the theoretical aspects of studies, but also training in practical gardening and husbandry techniques and immersive work with local peasantry. The elite students were encouraged to undertake self-activities such as student government, and also shouldered the responsibility of experimenting with and maintaining their land plots.

== At educational institutions ==
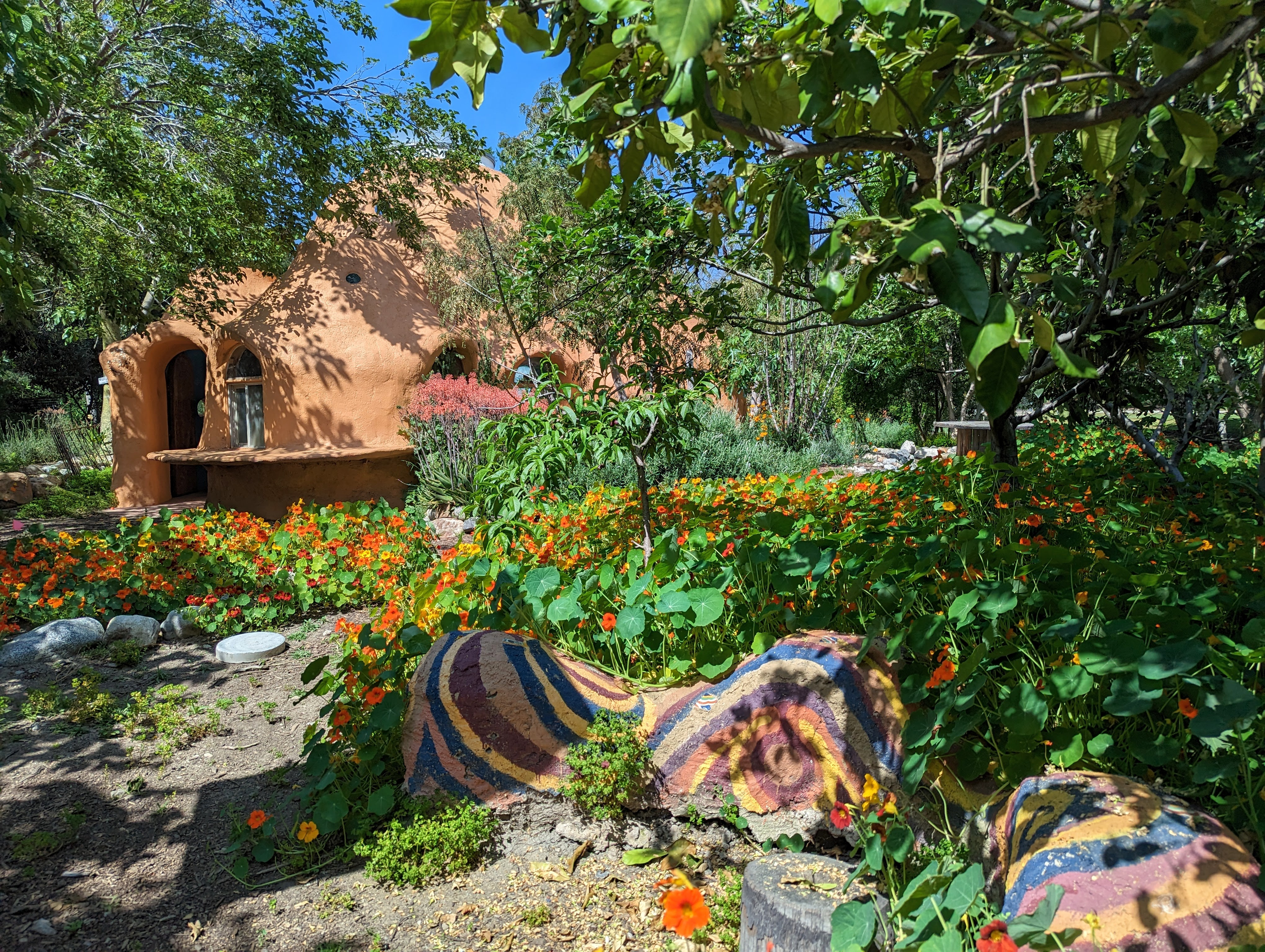
The Pomona College Organic Farm includes a superadobe earth dome.

Campus farms are common in the United States and other countries. They are used in some cases as part of educational curricula. They also sometimes help produce food for campus dining halls, but generally have low agricultural output.

== List of demonstration farms ==
Canada

- Central Experimental Farm, Ontario, Canada

India

- District Livestock Farm (Hosur, India), India

Spain

- Iturrieta, Spain

Tajikistan

- Food and Agriculture Organization of the United Nations (FAO) Digital Demo Farm, Tajikistan

USA

- University of Illinois Experimental Dairy Farm, Illinois
- Belle Fourche Experiment Farm, South Dakota
- Long Island Rail Road Demonstration Farm, New York
- Pomona College Organic Farm, California
- Wisconsin Demonstration Farm Networks, Wisconsin

== In the arts ==
In the 1916 novel Seventeen, which takes place in a small city in the Midwestern United States (probably Indiana), a group of perhaps 15 teenagers takes a trolley ride to a model farm. There, they take a guided tour, then adjourn for a huge farm-style luncheon served by farm staff and made from the farm's produce. A dance follows. In this scenario, the model farm was adjacent to the city. The farm served meals to the general public, and functioned as an entertainment destination.

During an episode of Kid Food Nation, the cast and the viewers see the processes it takes to grow, package and ship fresh food by getting a look inside Nature Fresh Farms greenhouse and packaging facilities.

== See also ==
- J W Poundley and D Walker (Land-surveyors and Architects)
- Leighton Hall, Powys
- Thomas Coke
- Wrexham Road Farm
- Sturgeons House

== Bibliography ==
- Flagg, Maurice Irwin. Model farm houses. St. Paul, Minn.: University of Minnesota, Dept. of Agriculture, Agricultural Extension Division, 1914. Print.
- Haslam, R, 1991,Leighton Hall Estate, Powys, Country Life 116–9.
- G.E. Mingay, The Victorian countryside, Volume 1 (Routledge, 2000), p214 ff.
- Robinson J M Georgian Model Farms: A Study of Decorative and Model Farm Buildings in the Age of Improvement 1700-1846. Oxford 1983.
- Sarah Tarlow. The archaeology of improvement in Britain, 1750-1850 (Cambridge University Press, 2007), p67 ff.
- Wade-Martins S. Historic Farm Buildings Batsford, London 1991.
- Wade-Martins S. 2002, The English Model Farm – Building the Agricultural Ideal, 1700-1914 English Heritage/Windgather Press.
- Wade-Martins S. 2010, The model farms of the Victorian Countryside “The Victorian: The magazine of the Victorian Society”. Issue 34, 4–8 July 2010
- Wiliam E, 1986 Historical Farm Buildings of Wales, John Donald, Edinburgh
