= District Livestock Farm (Hosur) =

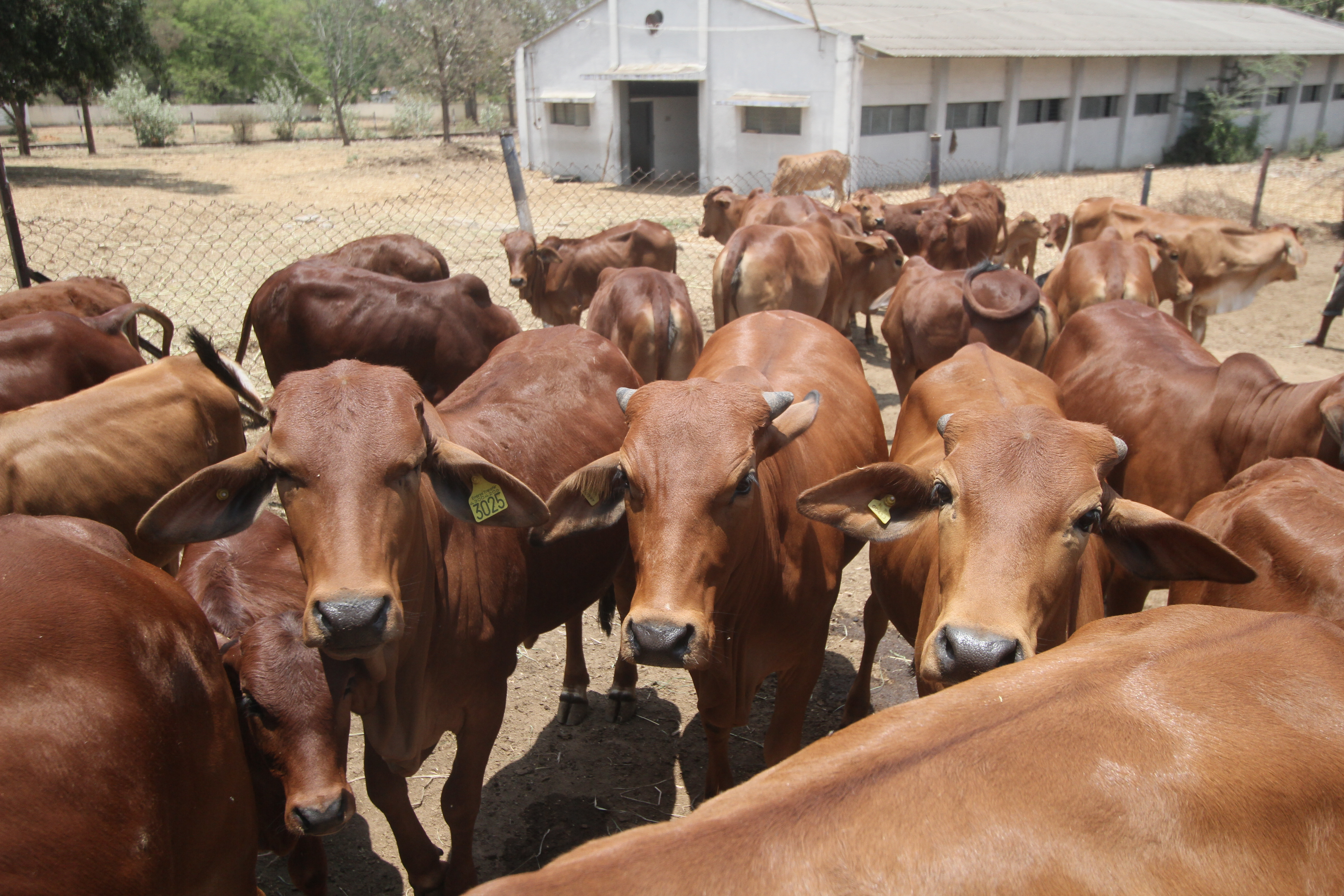
Red Sindhi calves have been produced through embryo transfer technology at this farm

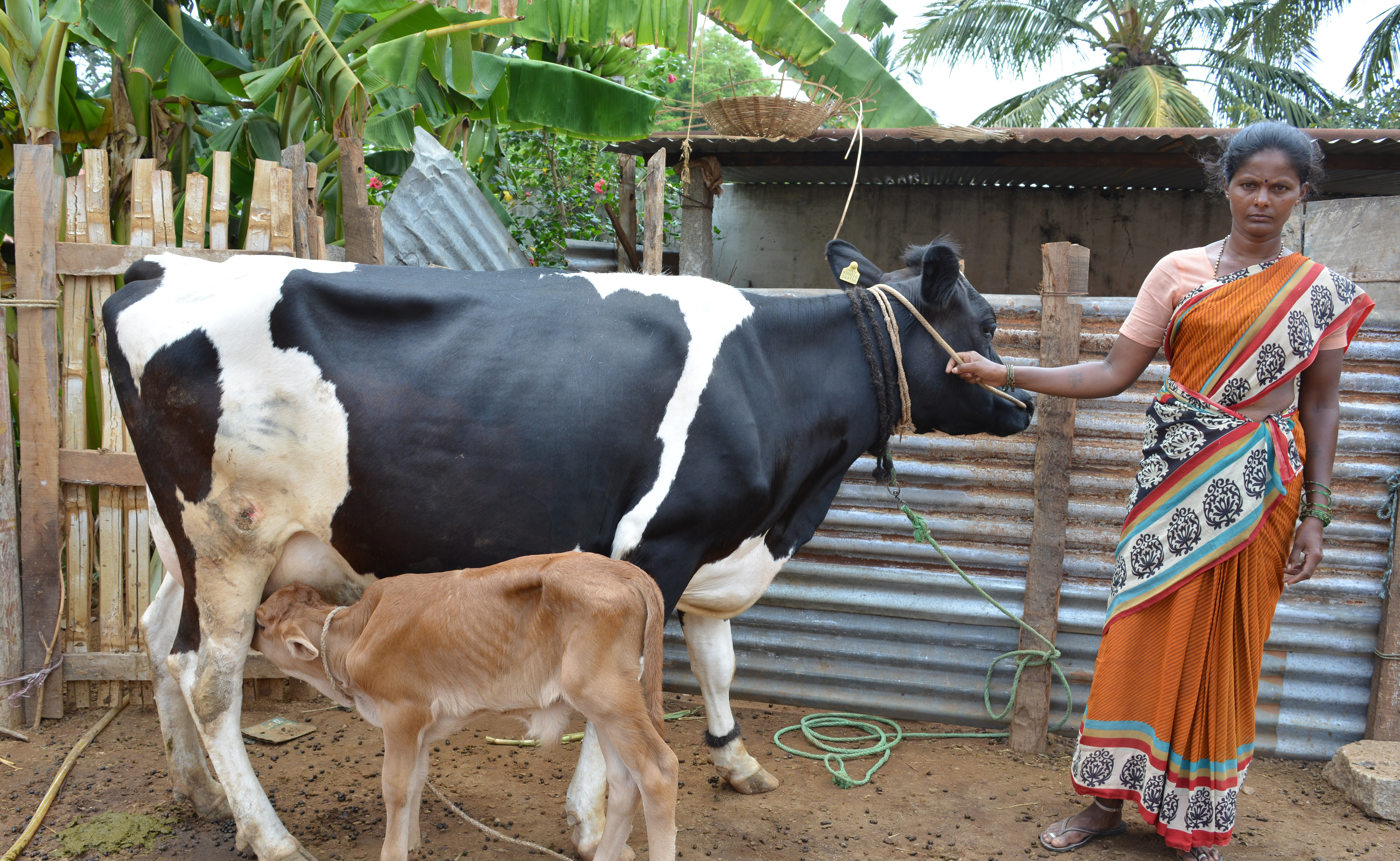
ET calf using farmer's cow

The District Livestock Farm, Hosur (or Hosur Cattle Farm) is a demonstration farm in Hosur, Tamil Nadu, India. The farm covers 1,641.41 acres and raises cattle and other livestock. The farm raises Red Sindhi cattle and Kangeyam cattle in order to "encourage pure breeding and to preserve native breeds."

The Farm has an embryo transfer laboratory. Embryos from Red Sindhi cows are collected by multiple ovulation and embryo transfer technology and are transferred to cross-bred recipient cows by non-surgical method. These recipient cows will carry the fetus till the rest of pregnancy and deliver the calf. So far, 286 calves have been produced through embryo transfer technology at this farm and field. Embryo transfer programme is also carried out in 15 districts from this embryo transfer unit. In the next project, indigenous calves like Red Sindhi, Kangayam, Pulikulam, Bargur, and Umbalachery will be produced through embryo transfer and IVF technologies at the farm. Apart from these projects, pure Jersey and HF embryos have been imported and transferred to the recipient cows at the Government Livestock farms at Chettinadu, Pudukottai and Naduvur. Twenty imported frozen pure Jersey embryos were transferred to crossbred cows and ten became pregnant.

== See also ==
- Animal husbandry in India
