= Majara Residence =

- اقامتگاه ماجرا
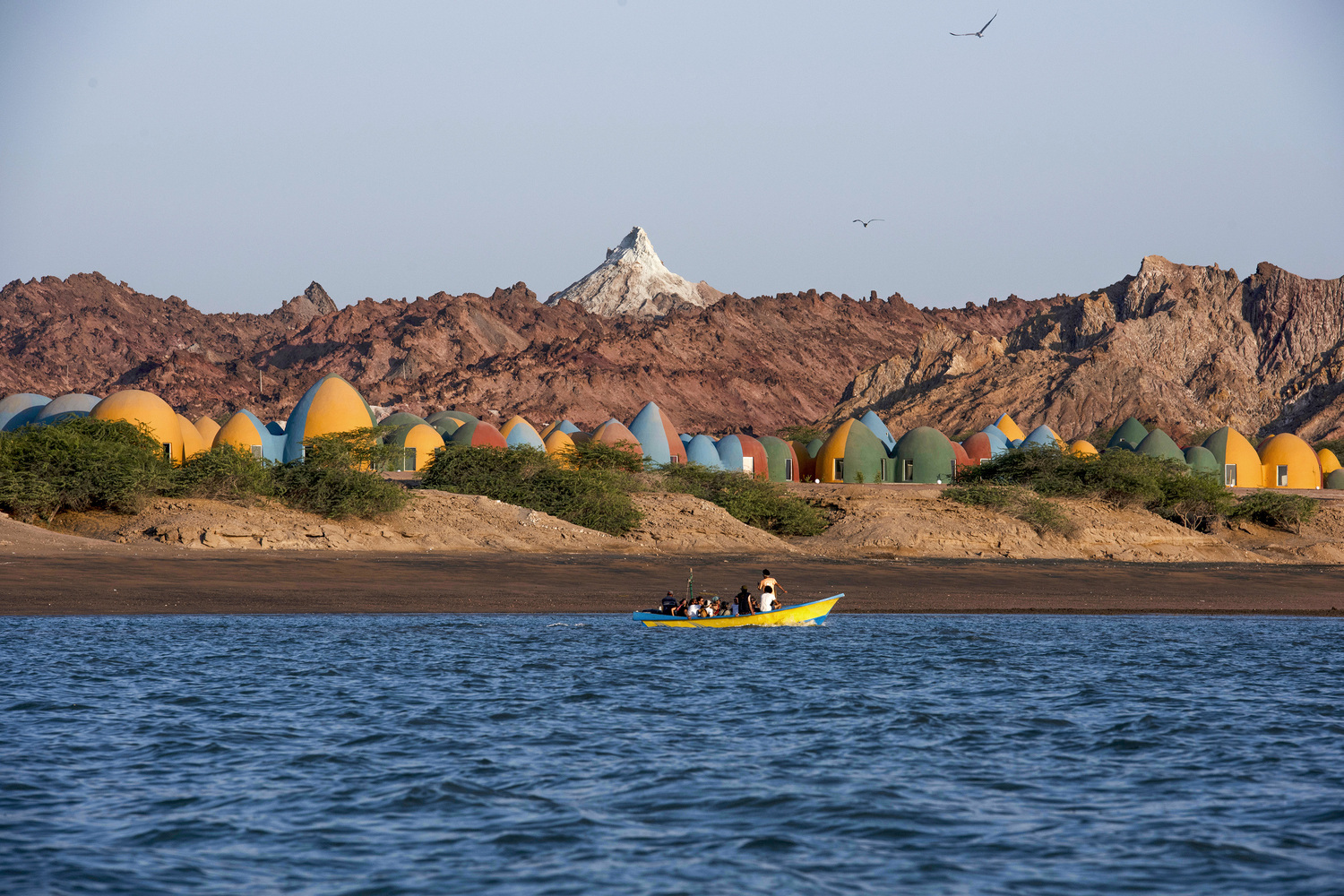
- Majara Residence, Hormuz Island viewed from the sea
- Alternative names: Presence in Hormuz 02

General information
- Status: Completed
- Type: Vacation homes
- Location: Hormuz Island, Iran
- Completed: 2020
- Client: Ehsan Rasoulof
- Owner: Ali Rezvani

Technical details
- Floor area: 4000 square meters
- Grounds: 10300 square meters

Design and construction
- Architect: ZAV Architects
- Main contractor: Amir Nobahari Tehrani
- Awards: Aga Khan Award for Architecture 2025, Archdaily Building of the Year 2021, Golden Award at Taipei International Design Award, 2nd prize at Memar Award public buildings category

References
- Archdaily Building of the Year 2021 Golden Award at Taipei Design Award 2020 2nd prize at Memar Award in the public building category

Majara Residence (Persian: ماجرا, lit. 'Adventure') is a seaside vacation complex on Hormuz Island in the Persian Gulf, south of Iran.

The complex consists of 200 colorful domes of varying sizes and shapes built with the participation of local residents using the Superadobe sandbag technique. The domes, some of them interconnected, contain both accommodation (17 suites hosting up to 85 guests) and public facilities such as restaurants and cafes. Completed in 2020, it is the first eco-tourism hotel on the island. It was designed by the Tehran-based architectural firm ZAV Architects and has been recognized internationally, winning several awards, including the Aga Khan Award for Architecture in 2025.

== History ==
=== Hormuz Island ===
For centuries, from 1300, Hormuz served as a historic port in mainland Iran. The Island of Hormuz, which lies 8 kilometers off the mainland, became a thriving trade center. After the Portuguese occupation of the island circa 1500, it entered a period of decline. Later recaptured by Iran's Abbas the Great, it never reached the success of the past. Today it is inhabited by around 6000 people whose main occupation is fishing. Most of the island is arid and uninhabited, and the economy is fragile. In the media, the name of the island is strongly connected to the strait of Hormuz, a strategic oil transit chokepoint that is often a site of tension between the Iranian government and the Western powers.

=== Tourism development ===
According to research, ecological, geographical, and cultural resources of Hormuz Island are potentially suitable for its development as an ecotourism and geotourism destination. Since 2009, through an annual land art event, tourists and nature-lovers started to rediscover the somewhat forgotten island. During this annual event called the Soil Carpet of Hormuz, in a coast 5 kilometers outside the boundaries of Hormuz city towards the west, a large area of 1300 square meters was covered with the ochre of various colors naturally existing in the island, tracing a pattern similar to that of a carpet but in a much larger scale, and therefore every year a carpet was “woven” using sand with the participation of artists and people. Today Hormuz is one of the most visited Iranian islands in the Persian Gulf despite lacking touristic infrastructure. The last Soil Carpet Event was held in 2014. Six years later in 2020, Majara residence was completed in the location of the campsite next to the soil carpet coast, with the participation of the Soil Carpet Event organizers, investors from Tehran, and the local people of Hormuz.

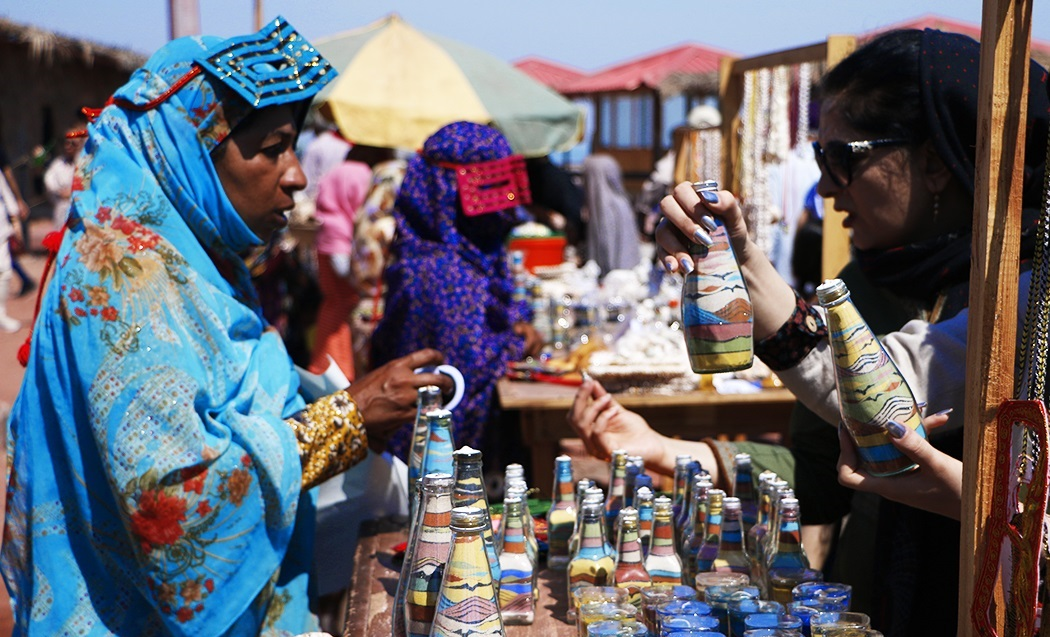
Tourists buying colorful ochre souvenirs from a local street vendor in Hormuz Island, Iran

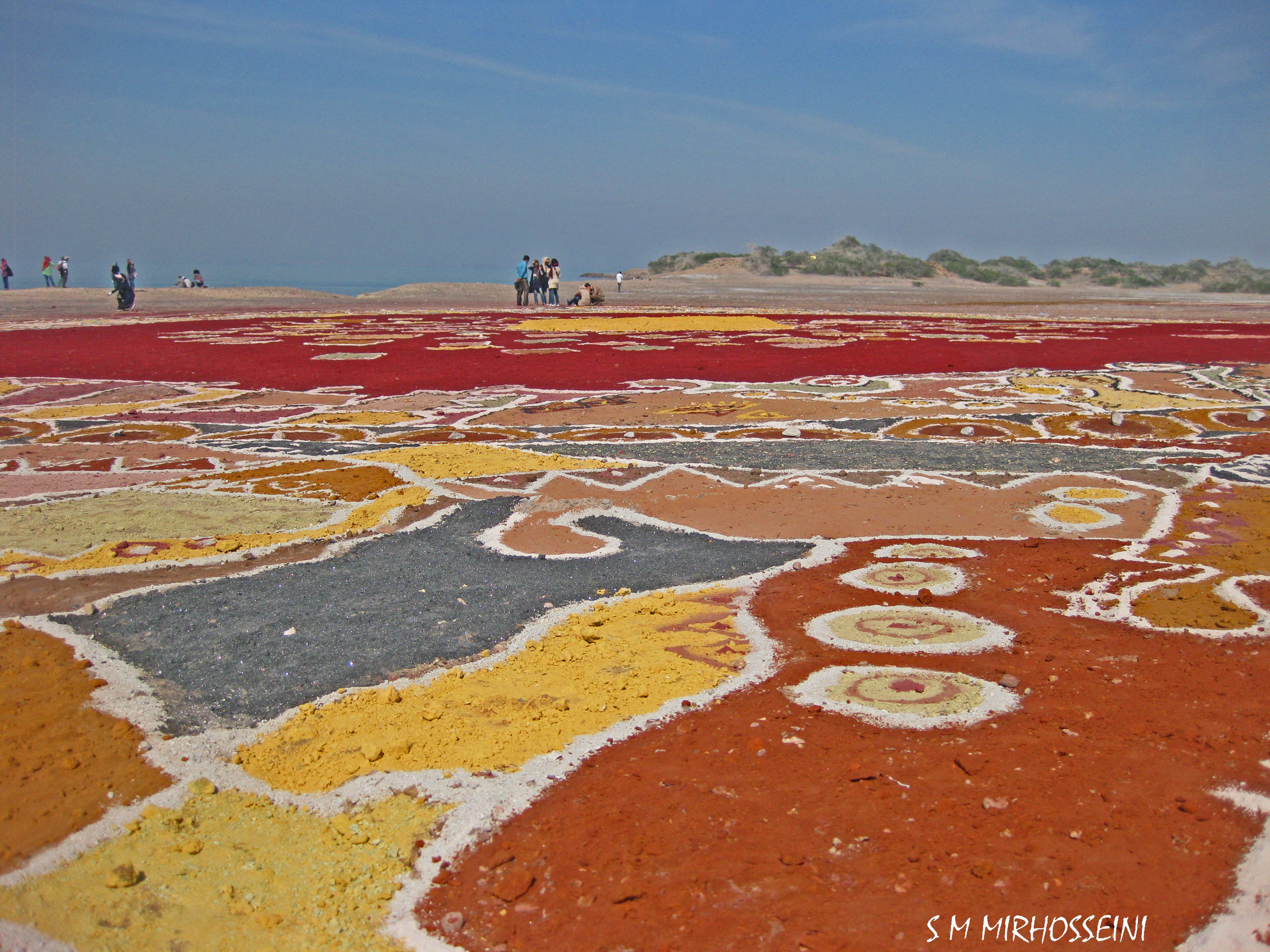
Hormuz Soil Carpet Event

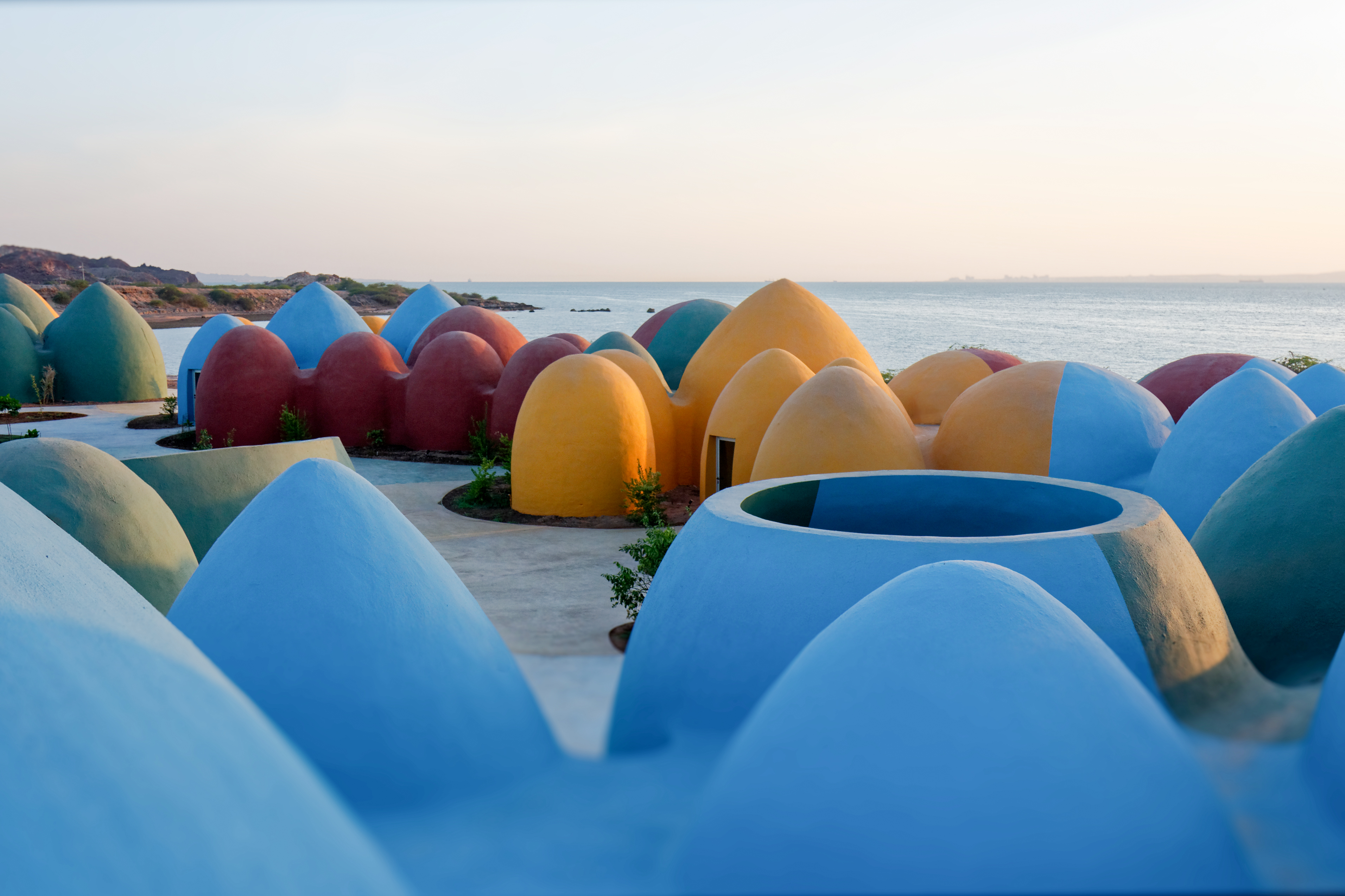
view from top of dome

=== Presence in Hormuz Development Plan ===
Presence in Hormuz's goal is to take a sensitive approach to the impact of mass tourism, through a series of private initiatives intended to draw tourists to an island lacking touristic infrastructure in an environmentally sensitive way to support the community. According to the architects, the goal of presence in Hormuz is not exactly boosting the number of visitors but to manage and monitor their presence on the island, their interaction with the local community, and their awareness of the fragile ecosystem of the island. Based on their timeline, Majara Residence is the second phase of Presence in Hormuz, hence its other name Presence in Hormuz 02. Other projects include Rong cultural center which opened in 2017 and Badban, a center for human-resource training and the management hub for the whole development, completed in 2021.

== Architecture ==
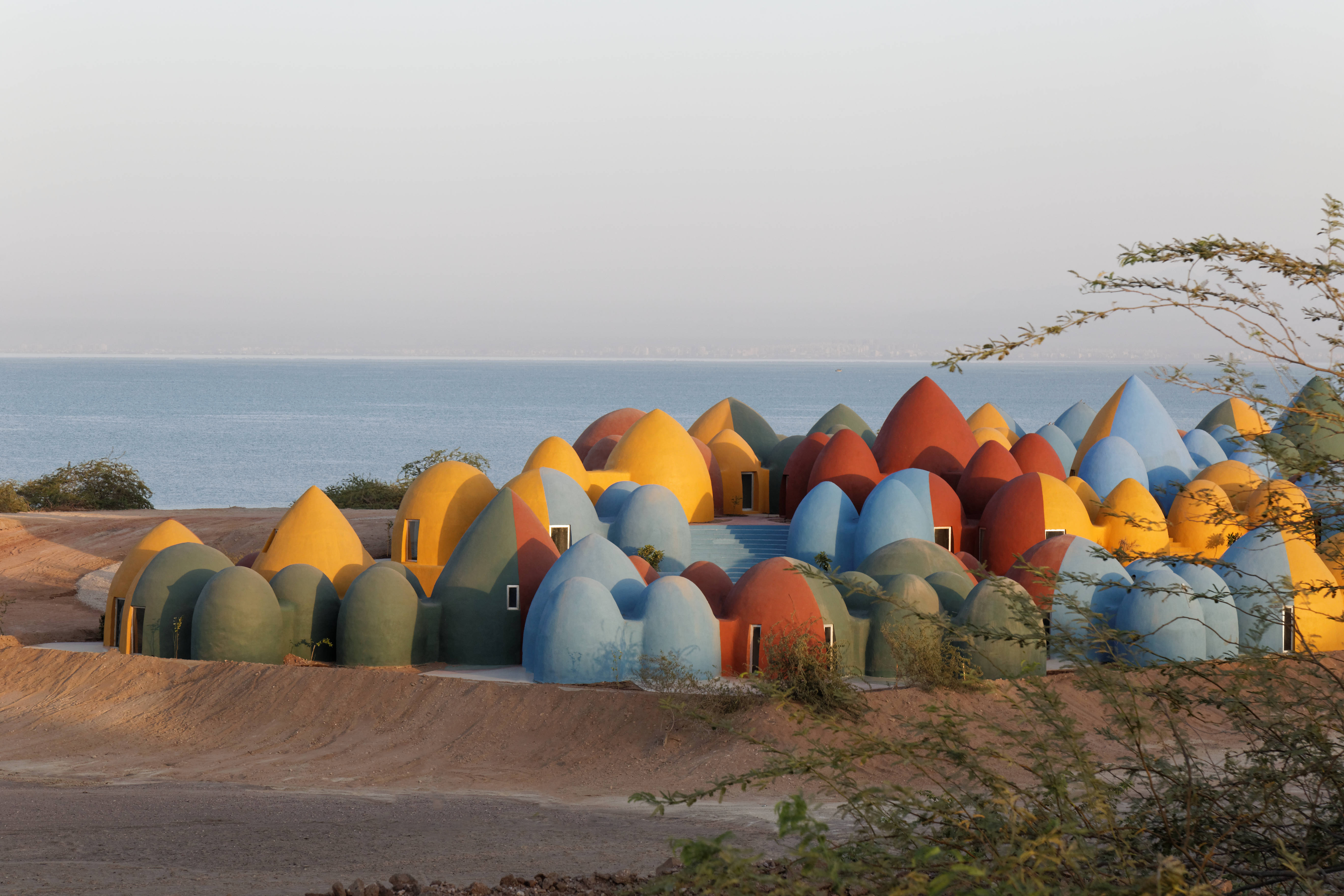
South east view

Majara residence consists of 200 domes, some of them interconnected, of different sizes and shapes, organized like a small neighborhood or a village 5 kilometers outside the city of Hormuz.

The domes form a cluster with walkways and other connective spaces between them. It covers an area of 10300 square meters, with 6300 square meters of open space and 4000 of built area. The domes are used for a variety of purposes. 130 domes host 17 suites with a maximum capacity of 85 guests. The rest are galleries, restaurants, cafes, a prayer room, a souvenir shop, and tourist info points.

The domes were made using the Superadobe technique, a construction technology pioneered by Iranian-American architect Nader Khalili in the second half of the 20th century, which earned him an Aga Khan Award. The technique involves layering bags filled with earth and sand, using on-site soil to create a compression structure like domes and other structural forms. For Majara, ZAV customized the Superadobe process to allow the creation of larger-radius and lower-height domes. In this process, 50 local unskilled workers were trained to become construction masters. This type of structure is well-suited to the arid climate of the island as earth provides a high thermal mass.

The project's commercial goal was to complete the project with minimal investment, the budget of the project being equivalent to 900.000 US Dollars (1.800.000.000.000 IRR in 2020). Within its low budget, it shifts its impetus from material costs that often bear an excessive transportation/import component to labor costs that directly benefit the community.

The shape and colors of the building try to echo Hormuz's colorful landscapes and topography. The domes of Majara are colored with tints of yellow, red, blue, and green, and the use of the naturally colored ochre of the island was avoided due to environmental reasons. The interiors are also characterized by these tones, whose variations match exterior colors. Pieces of furniture are a mix of pieces produced in the region and custom designs executed by Hormuz craftspeople.

== See also ==
- Hormuz Island
- Iranian architecture
- Superadobe
