= ZAV Architects =

Architectural practice based in Tehran, Iran

Practice information
- Key architects: Mohamadreza Ghodousi, Fateme Rezaei Fakhr, Golnaz Bahrami
- Founders: Mohamadreza Ghodousi, Parsa Ardam
- Founded: 2006
- Location: Tehran

Significant works and honors
- Projects: Majara Residence, Type-less Building, Farsh Film Studio
- Awards: AD100, Memar Awards, ArchDaily Building of the Year, AR New into Old Award, Dezeen Awards, AR House Awards

Website
- https://zavarchitects.com/

ZAV Architects (Persian: طراحان و بناکنندگان زاو) is an architectural practice based in Tehran, Iran.

== Background ==
ZAV Architects was established in 2006 by architects Mohamadreza Ghodousi and Parsa Ardam. The firm is known for an adaptable architectural approach, which emphasizes resourcefulness and the use of local materials and workforce.

== Awards ==
ZAV Architects was named an Honoree in the AD100 Best Designers in the Middle East and Africa in 2024 and 2025. The firm has won the following awards:

- Aga Khan Award for Architecture (2025) for Majara Residence
- ArchDaily Building of the Year (2021) for Majara Residence
- AR New into Old Award (2021) for Farsh Film Studio
- Dezeen Awards (2019) for Rong Cultural Center
- AR House Awards (2018) for Habitat for Orphan Girls

== Notable works ==
- Majara Residence, Hormuz, Iran, 2020 - An accommodation complex on Hormuz Island featuring 200 domes constructed using the Superadobe technique.
- Type-less Building, Hormuz, Iran, 2022 - A two-story educational and community center designed with adaptable spaces, recycled materials, and low-tech construction to follow a circular economy.
- Rong Cultural Center, Hormuz, Iran, 2017
- Farsh Film Studio, Tehran, Iran, 2017 - Conversion of a 1930s house in Tehran into a film school and underground cinema, using reclaimed materials.
- Baba Beski Tomb, Gonbad-e Kavus, Iran, 2020
- Pedari Guest House, Khansar, Iran, 2011
- Habitat for Orphan Girls, Khansar, Iran, 2014
