= Refugee shelter =

Refugee shelters are structures ranging from the most temporary tent accommodation through transitional shelter to building temporary pics and settlements and include the most basic kind of ad hoc structure. They are created in the aftermath of a conflict or natural disaster as a temporary residence for victims who have lost or abandoned their homes. Refugees and IDPs are people fleeing their homes or countries of origin due to natural disasters, war and political or religious persecution in search of refuge and resettlement. Living in these shelters, refugees may endure crowded, noisy, dirty, disease filled grounds where thousands of families are cramped together and surviving day by day.

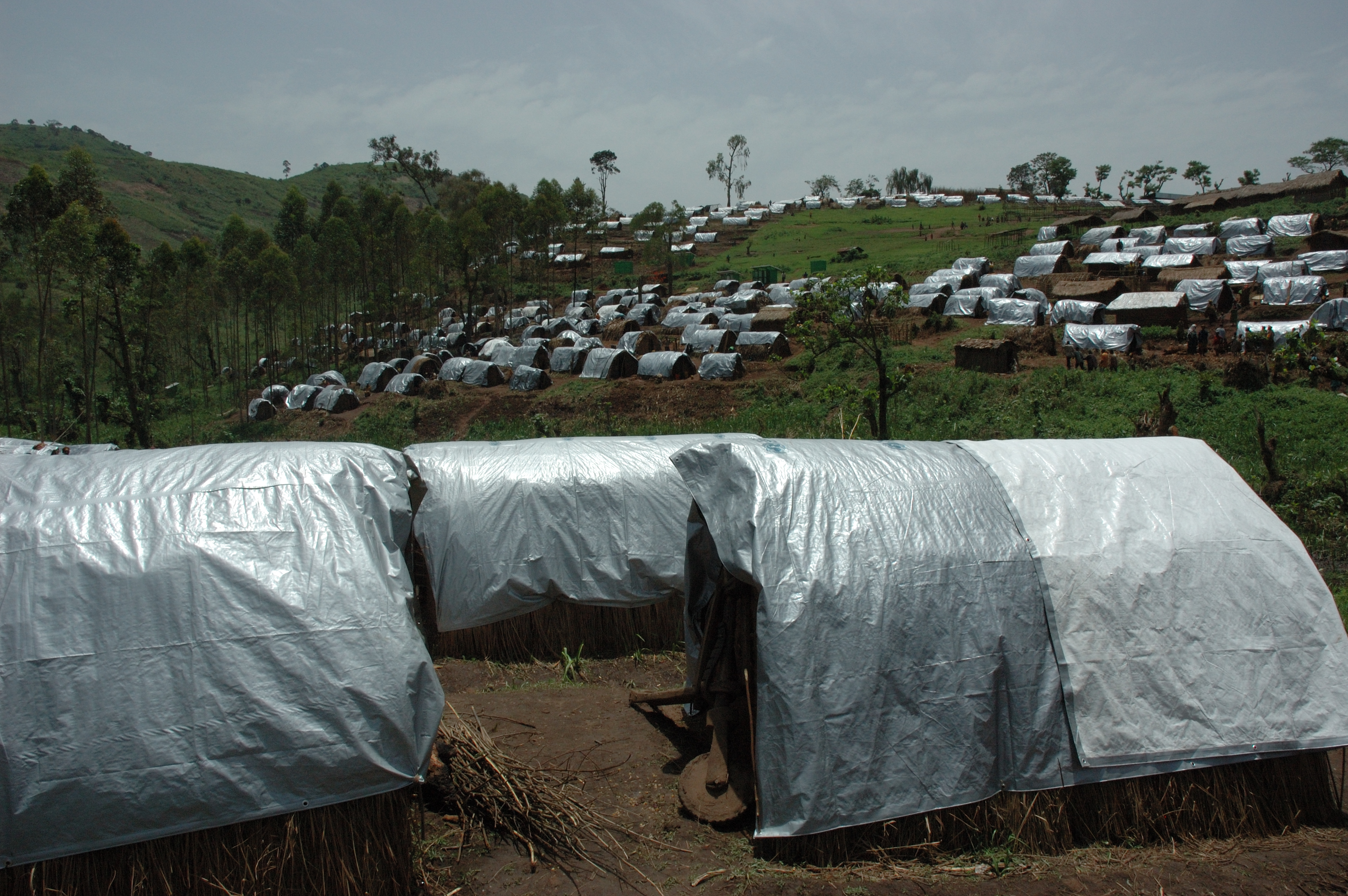
Nyanzale camp, DR Congo

Refugees and IDPs can often be found living in refugee camps or IDP camps and in these shelters for upwards of a decade. Design models, disaster-relief programs, and land tenure issues play a large role in the progression of recovery and categorization of settlements as temporary.

== Aims ==
The design of temporary houses is especially important as these are the first spaces that provide a degree of normality after the disaster. Temporary housing is initially modeled only to account for vital and functional needs of victims during the period of resettlement. Agencies design their models with the premise of meeting the individuals’ basic needs in addition to creating awareness regarding the need for a “home” instead of merely a shelter after a forced resettlement. After disasters, since people suffer a complete break in the social, economic, and physical aspects of life, there is an urgent need for protection and shelter. Temporary housing with minimum living conditions are almost always limited and loosely involve spaces to live, sleep and socialize as well as areas for food preparation, personal hygiene, and privacy. The basic stages and design of a post-disaster environment aim to create an ideal situation including temporary housing that is practical, aids in psychological recovery, and is environmentally sensitive.

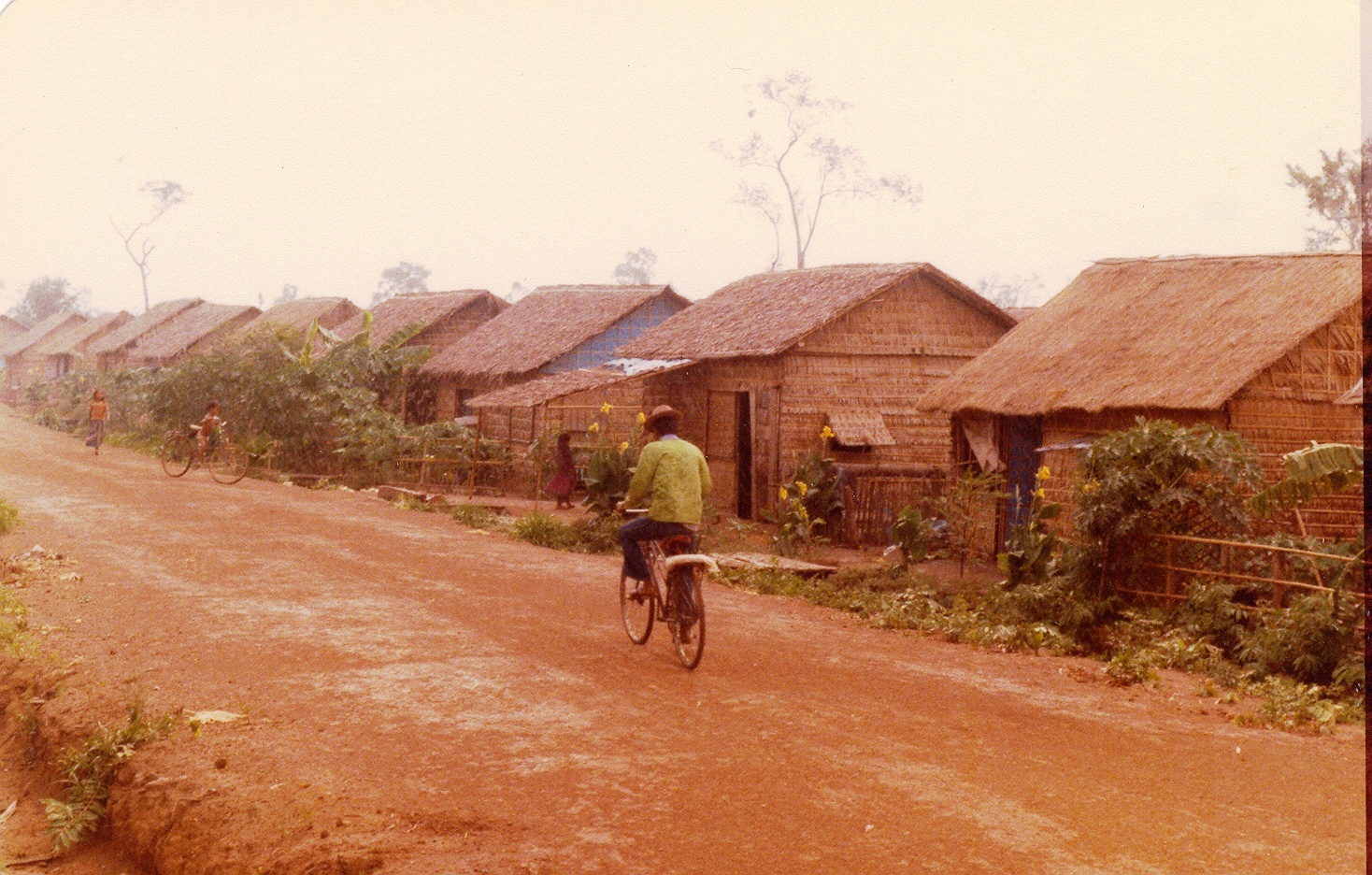
Bamboo and thatch houses built by refugees in Nong Samet Refugee Camp on the Thai-Cambodian border, May 1984

== Living conditions ==
Disasters, particularly those triggered by nature, are often followed by a swift humanitarian relief response. Emergency humanitarian relief focuses on responding to the immediate need for restoration of basic services, medical treatment and medical supplies, food, and temporary shelter; and is a short-term, strenuous and often improvised effort. Unlike most normal construction projects, post-disaster housing projects are diverse in nature, have unique socio-cultural and economical requirements and are extremely dynamic. Due to the immediate need of resources, shelter, and medical services created by disaster or conflict, a quick, affordable, and available solution in the form of tents is usually implemented. The aim of refugee shelter is to protect families from outside dangers and create spaces inside to protect their privacy and bring back feelings of security.

=== Tents ===
For the majority of refugee and IDP populations under direct aid via government or humanitarian relief groups, camps of thousands live in small scout-style tents. These emergency shelters consist of unplanned and spontaneously sought locations that are intended only to provide protection from the elements and typically constructed in large open areas. Simple tent structures, grouped together to form a "tent city", are commonly made of canvas military issue tents which are criticized for being heavy, bulky, uninsulated, poorly made and for rotting in under a year. Extensive issues – e.g. they soon become crowded, uncomfortable, and unsafe – have been encountered in refugee camps throughout the world.

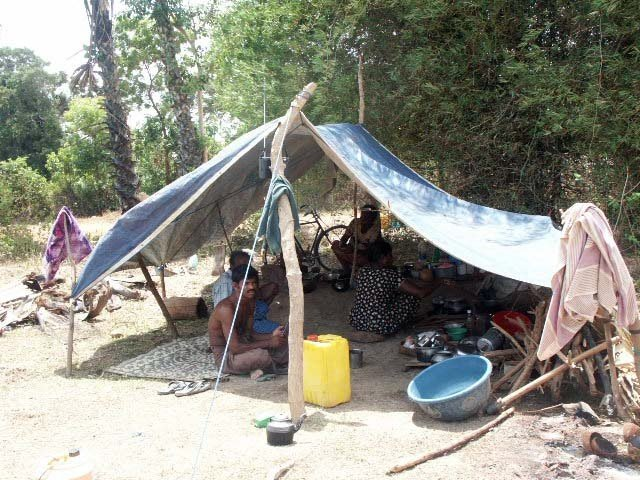
Shelter from tarp and sticks

=== Secondary disaster ===
Temporary housing situations often lack several qualities of homes that are significant at this stage for victims, such as windows, warmth, color, space, and security. The problem of noise also contributes negatively to the privacy of the residents of temporary houses. Sounds of crying people after an earthquake or other disaster are chronic in neighboring houses. Additional damage is caused by rain, leading to floods, and gas leaks which often create fires. In these secondary disasters, temporary housing units frequently become dysfunctional, and the disaster-victims become homeless once again. Other problems have been described as such: lack of privacy, lack of private life; lack of space; all family members forced to sleep in the same space; lack of opportunity to consider feelings of others, including fear, sadness and grief; weather conditions; disease-ridden; the presence of public toilets and their sanitation; considerations of hygiene; toilets constantly being blocked; lack of water, including for laundry and dish-washing; heating, cooling, electricity problems; humidity; leakage of rain water into the housing space; the presence of insects; lack of windows; lack of sunlight in the houses; transportation to and from the housing location; difficulty of obtaining food; and insufficient quantity of shelters. All this can be perceived, by the victims, as secondary disaster. A quote from a journalist recording the daily lives of refugees in Palestine expresses her feelings after visiting a camp for the first time:

"Entering the refugee camp, I feel I am entering some medieval ghetto. I walk along a narrow alleyway, skirting an open sewage ditch. I pass tens of dozens of one and two-room houses, each leaning on the other for support. I am in a ghetto without streets, sidewalks, gardens, patios, trees, flowers, plazas, or shops—among an uprooted, stateless, scattered people who, like the Jews before them, are in a tragic diaspora. I pass scores of small children, the third generation of Palestinians born in the ghetto that has almost as long a history as the state of Israel itself. Someone has said that for every Jew who was brought in to create a new state, a Palestinian Arab was uprooted and left homeless."

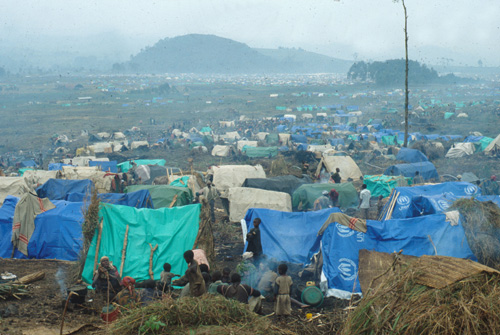
Rwandan refugee camp in east Zaire

== Design considerations ==
When considering emergency, temporary, housing the following revolve around the success of such shelter and relief efforts:

- cost (how much per shelter? cost of resources? cost of living?)
- availability (are necessary resources available? are they available under pressure/time? who will provide them?)
- transport time (how long to require necessary materials?)
- setup time (how long does it take to set up? how many people does it require? what if pieces are missing?)
- quality (what is it made of? does it protect from the environment?)
- durability (how long is it meant to last? can it easily be damaged, if so can it be fixed?)
- size (number of persons per room. kitchen? wash space? sleep space?)
- security (does the house have a lock? are there windows? is it surrounded by other emergency shelters? can belongings be left safely?)
- weather proof (protection from environmental conditions, extreme heat, extreme cold, winds, rains)
- design / look (color? aesthetics? is it culturally sensitive? religious space? is it near nature?)
- privacy (separate rooms? locks on doors?)
- noise
- cleanliness
- distance to work/ school/ religious services/ washroom.

The questions presented above are often incompletely answered and accounted for when preparing for a post-disaster settlement.

=== User involvement ===
Since the most effective relief and reconstruction policies result from the participation of survivors in determining and planning their own needs, the successful performance of assisting groups is dependent on the accountability to appeal to and include local aid. Psychologists and humanitarian groups suggest that it is advantageous for both individual and community participation in the financing of their own shelter programs, especially permanent reconstruction. Incorporation of potential users not only with regard to having a say in the shelter, but also in the design, planning and constructing of the shelters has been shown to contribute to pain relief and suffering. Architects and psychologists have been in collaboration to construct design models that are holistic and functional, providing for both the most basic, physical needs as well as the psychological expectations from a post-disaster reality.

== Roles and responsibilities ==
In some cases, the entire burden of assistance and relief is placed on the national government, whereas in others, responsibility is varied across multiple levels of government and outside aid. Reconstruction is closely linked to land tenure, government policy, and all aspects of land-use and infrastructure planning. Resource management and availability is always a consistent issue in emergency recovery however there has been success when relief is found as locally as possible.

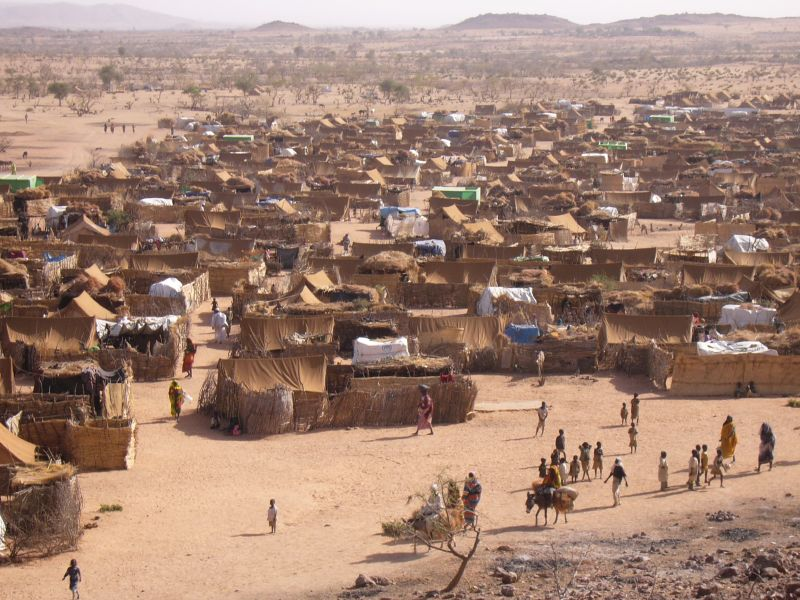
Refugee camp, Chad

The Office of the United Nations High Commissioner for Refugees or UNHCR, is a United Nations agency that protects and supports refugees. When the UNHCR was first established, material aspects of refugee relief (e.g., housing, food) were seen to be the responsibility of the hosting government. As many of the world's more recent major refugee communities have occurred in less developed countries, the UNHCR has acquired the additional role of coordinating material assistance for refugees and returnees. Although this was not UNHCR's original mandate, coordination of material assistance has become one of its principal functions alongside protection and the promotion of solutions.

== Innovative practices ==
There are scores of innovative approaches to constructing temporary shelters, but few make it to the field. Architect Shigeru Ban has designed temporary and permanent structures with paper tubes as the underlying structure, used after the Kobe earthquake. Cal-Earth Institute has also developed "superadobe" which makes use of sandbags and barbed wire to form an emergency shelter for disaster relief.

Shigeru Ban is a Japanese architect famous for innovation with recycled paper/cardboard and has quickly and effectively housed disaster victims. He began working with cardboard tubing in cooperation with the UNHCR during the humanitarian crisis of war-torn Rwanda in 1994. Designed for easy construction by an unskilled labor force, each barn-shaped unit consists of a paper tube frame covered with plastic tarps. Polyurethane-coated cylinders are linked together with plywood joints and rope, resulting in a very stable, waterproof structure that maximizes internal space. Sand filled crates acts as a platform and floor for the shelters and protects from floods, rain, and snow. The paper is low cost low tech, recyclable, and replaceable. As designed the shelters take less than six hours to construct.

In addition, the social enterprise Better Shelter and the UNHCR have developed a modular refugee shelter in collaboration with the IKEA Foundation (philanthropic arm of the large furniture company Ikea, notable for its user-friendly setup and mass production). These models include light-weight polymer panels attached to a steel frame. They take only about four hours to assemble and come flat-packed with panels, pipes, connectors, and wires, with a solar-powered LED light inside with a USB outlet.

Despite numerous attempts — Shigeru Ban's cardboard houses, the Better Shelter flat-pack shelter, the superadobe, and more — designing the appropriate shelter that encompasses all the necessary characteristics for refugees continues to be an ongoing process involving architects and psychologists alike.
