= Superadobe =

Form of earthbag construction

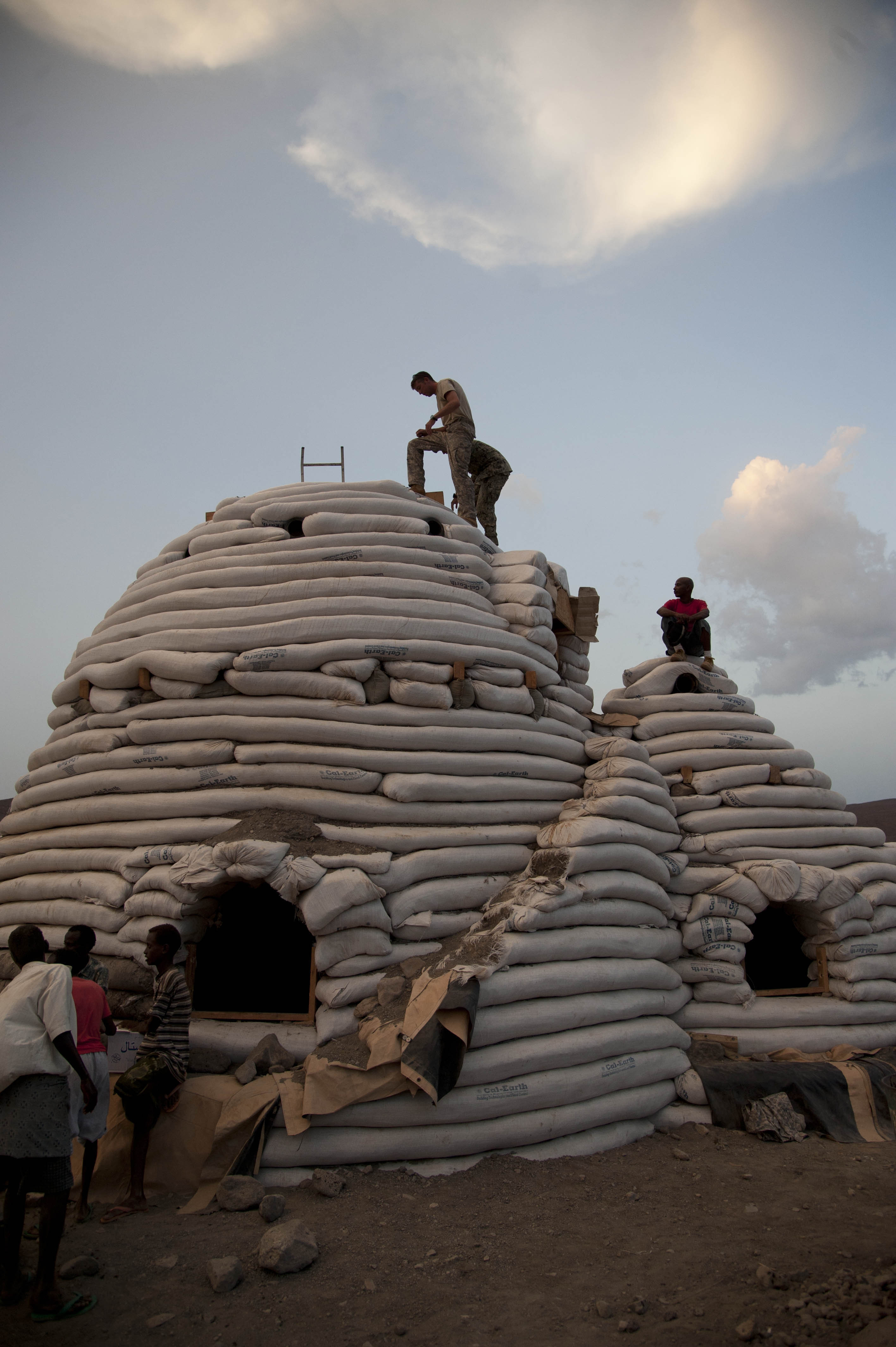
Cal-Earth polypropylene tubes (sandbags) being used to construct domed structures

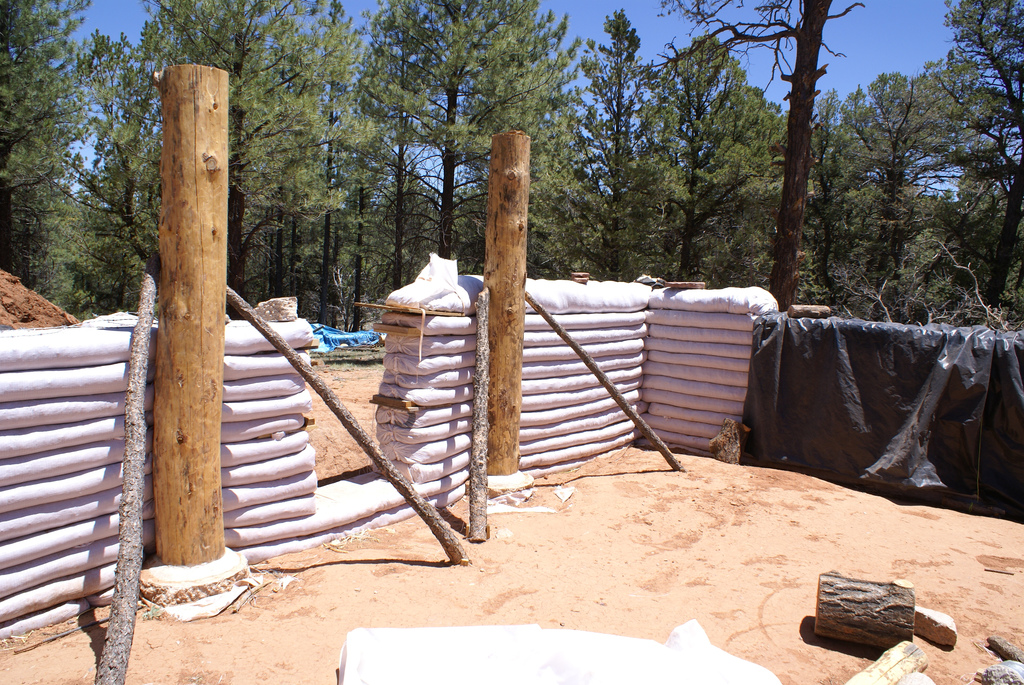
Superadobe Construction

Superadobe is a form of earthbag construction that was developed by Iranian architect Nader Khalili. The technique uses layered long fabric tubes or bags filled with adobe to form a compression structure. The resulting beehive-shaped structures employ corbelled arches, corbelled domes, and vaults to create sturdy single and double-curved shells. It has received growing interest for the past two decades in the natural building and sustainability movements.

== History ==
Nader Khalili popularized earthbag construction. Initially in 1984 in response to a NASA call for housing designs for future human settlements on the Moon and on Mars, he proposed using Moon dust to fill the plastic Superadobe tubes and velcroing together the layers (instead of using barbed wire). He came to term his particular technique of earthbag construction "Superadobe". Some projects have been done using bags as low-tech foundations for straw-bale construction. They can be covered in a waterproof membrane to keep the straw dry.

In 1995, Khalili built 15 refugee shelters in Iran, with the United Nations Development Programme (UNDP) and the United Nations High Commissioner for Refugees (UNHCR), in response to refugees from the Persian Gulf War. According to Khalili, the cluster of 15 domes that was built could have been repeated by the thousands. The government dismantled the camp a few years later. Since then, the Superadobe Method has been put to use in Canada, Mexico, Brazil, Belize, Costa Rica, Chile, Iran, India, Russia, Mali, and Thailand, as well as in the United States.

While Superadobe constructions have generally been limited to approximately 4 meters in diameter, larger structures have been created by grouping several "beehives" together to form a network of domes. There is a 32′ (10m) dome being constructed in the San Ignacio area of Belize, which when finished will be the center dome of an eco-resort complex.

BBC News reported in March 2019 that superadobe structures have withstood earthquakes as severe as 7.2 magnitude.

== Usage of Superadobe in contemporary architecture ==
According to CalEarth, Superadobe domes and vaults have been built in at least 49 countries on six continents, including Algeria, Australia, Brazil, Canada, Colombia, Costa Rica, Guatemala, Hungary, India, Iran, Japan, Jordan, Mexico, Oman, Sierra Leone, Tanzania, United States, Venezuela, and the West Bank. They range from backyard landscaping, to private homes to eco-resorts or community centres.

The superdobe was initially intended for temporary shelter and housing the displaced, because of its low-tech construction, the availability of its materials, and its resistance against natural forces. In 2004, the Aga Khan Award for Architecture went to a cluster of 14 modest buildings in Baninajar, Iran by Nader Khalili. These domes were built ten years earlier to house refugees from the Iran–Iraq War and the construction was carried out by the United Nations Development Programme and the United Nations High Commissioner for Refugees. The award also recognized the potential of these buildings as a prototype for a new kind of temporary housing.

Since then, many permanent private homes were built using the superadobe technique. For instance, house Quetzalcoatl in Costa Rica is composed of five full domes and four half domes using the earthbag technique.

Some buildings use it for other uses than residential. The 100 Classrooms for Refugee Children by Emergency Architecture & Human Rights hosts Syrian and Jordanian children in Za’atari village 10 km from the Syrian border.

The Langbos Children’s Centre, in the rural Eastern Cape of South Africa, was designed by Jason Erlank Architects to provide a multi-functional space for community-driven initiatives in Langbos. It consists of four domes of a total area of 217 square metres.

The Majara Residence on Hormuz Island in the South of Iran is a cluster of 200 small-scale interconnected superadobe domes that form a neighbourhood of 15 residences and public facilities and is designed by ZAV Architects. The domes and the landscape surrounding them covers an area of 10300 square metres, while the built space is around 4000 square metres. This project was preceded by a prototype called Rong Cultural Center which tested the Superadobe technique on the same island.

== Bibliography ==
- Khalili, Nader. "Nader Khalili." Cal-Earth. 19 Jan. 2007 .
- Katauskas, Ted. "Dirt-Cheap Houses from Elemental Materials." Architecture Week. Aug. 1998. 19 Jan. 2007 .
- Husain, Yasha. "Space-Friendly Architecture: Meet Nader Khalili." Space.com. 17 Nov. 2000. 19 Jan. 2007 Space News - Latest Space and Astronomy News | Space.
- Sinclair, Cameron, and Kate Stohr. "SuperAdobe." Design Like You Give a Damn. Ed. Diana Murphy, Adrian Crabbs, and Cory Reynolds. New York: Distributed Art Publishers, Inc., 2006. 104–13.
- Kellogg, Stuart, and James Quigg. "Good Earth." Daily Press. 18 Dec. 2005.
- Freedom Communications, Inc. 22 Jan. 2007 .
- Alternative Construction: Contemporary Natural Building Methods. Ed. Lynne Elizabeth and Cassandra Adams. New York: John Wiley & Sons, Inc., 2000.
- Hunter, Kaki, and Donald Kiffmeyer. Earthbag Building. Gabriola Island, BC: New Society Publishers, 2004.
- Kennedy, Joseph F. "Building With Earthbags." Natural Building Colloquium. NetWorks Productions. 14 Feb. 2007 Natural Building Colloquium.
- Aga Khan Development Network. "The Aga Khan Award for Architecture 2004." Sandbag Shelter Prototypes, various locations. 14 Feb. 2007 .
- The Green Building Program. "Earth Construction." Sustainable Building Sourcebook. 2006. 14 Feb. 2007 .
- NBRC. "NBRC Misc. Photos." NBRC: Other Super Adobe Buildings. 10 Dec. 1997. 14 Feb. 2007 .
- CCD. "CS05__Cal-Earth SuperAdobe." Combating Crisis with Design. 20 Sept. 2006. 14 Feb. 2007 CS05__Cal-Earth SuperAdobe.
- American Institute of Architects. A Conversation with Nader Khalili. 2004. 14 Feb. 2007 .
- New York Times. When Shelter is made from the Earth's Own Dust. 15 Apr 1999

== See also ==
- Earthbag construction
