= Nader Khalili =

Iranian-American architect

- Born: 1936; Tehran, Iran
- Died: March 5, 2008 (aged 71–72); Los Angeles, California, U.S.
- Education: University of Tehran, Istanbul Technical University
- Occupation: Architect
- Design: Ceramic house, Earthbag construction, Superadobe

Nader Khalili (Persian: نادر خلیلی; 1936–2008) was an Iranian-born American architect, author, and educator. He is best known for his inventive structures that incorporated a range of atypical building materials to provide shelter in the developing world and emergency contexts. His work was heavily influenced by the traditional arid house designs of Iran.

== Early life and education ==
Nader Khalili was born in Tehran, Iran into a large family, he had 8 siblings. He attended the University of Tehran where he studied Persian literature and poetry; followed by the study of engineering and architecture at Istanbul Technical University.

== Career ==
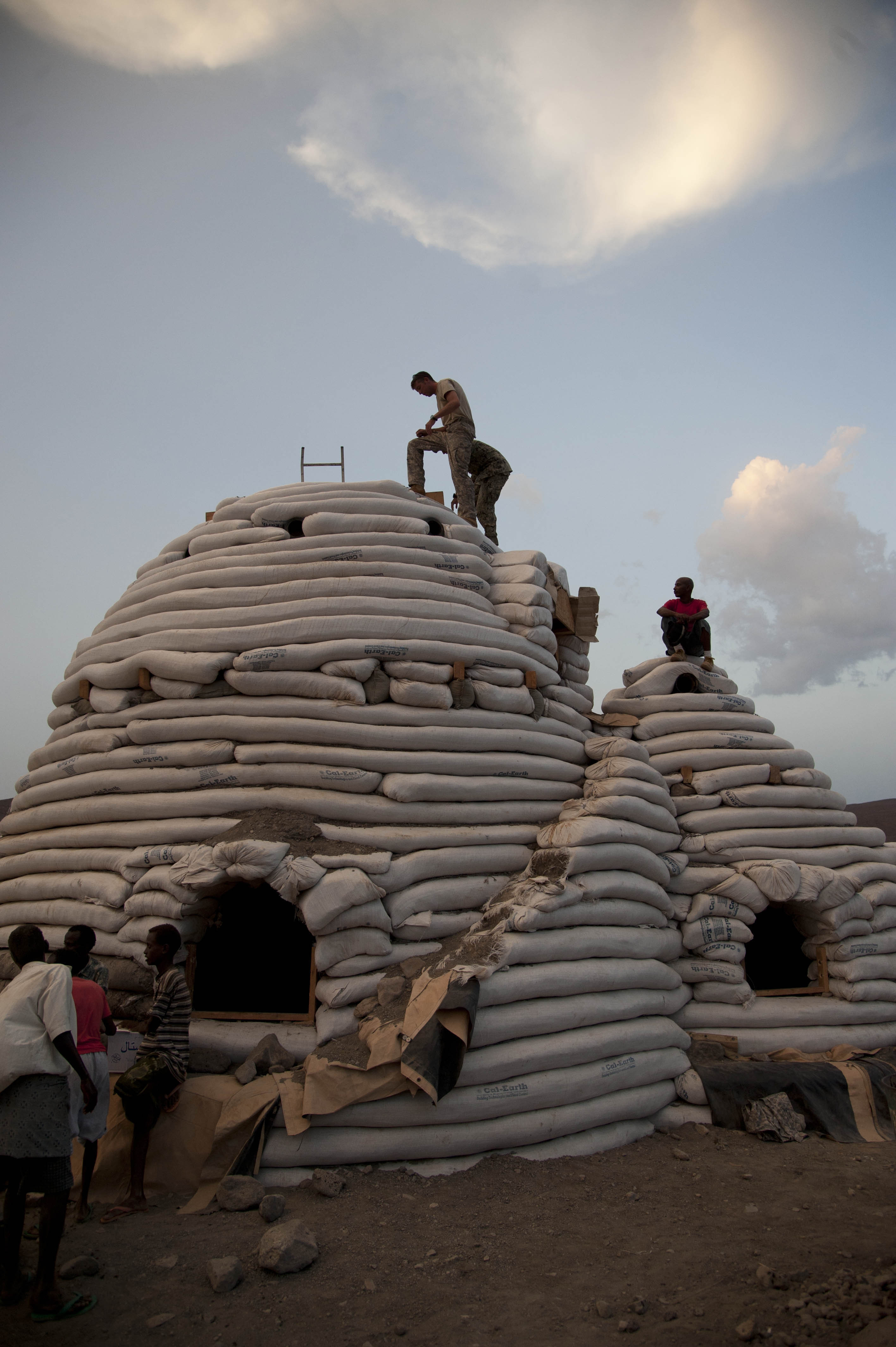
Eco-Dome sandbag shelter under construction in Djibouti, May 2012

In 1970, he was licensed by the state of California and practiced architecture in the U.S. and around the world. In 1975, Khalili was working in Iran at a conventional western-style architecture firm, when he realized his profits were coming at the expense of traditional Iranian architecture. He sold his stake in the firm, bought a motorcycle, and spent the next five years living in remote parts of the Iran desert. His goal was to preserve the historical Iranian architecture and help house the poor.

His designs are heavily inspired by traditional arid house designs in his homeland Iran. He was involved with Earth Architecture and Third World Development since 1975, and was a U.N. consultant for Earth Architecture. Khalili was known for his innovation into the Geltaftan Earth-and-Fire System known as Ceramic Houses and the Earthbag Construction technique called Superadobe.

He developed his Super Adobe system in 1984, in response to a NASA call for designs for human settlements on the moon and Mars. The project had been completely theoretical until the Persian Gulf War in 1990–1991 when refugees were sent into Iran. When this occurred Khalili partnered with the United Nations Development Programme (UNDP) and the United Nations High Commissioner for Refugees (UNHCR) and applied his research to emergency shelters.

In 1991 he founded the California Institute of Earth Art and Architecture (Cal-Earth), where he taught his Superadobe building technique. Although Khalili's work received mixed support in his native country, arguably due to social paradigms and political unrest, he became a prominent American leader on the value of ethically based architecture, where the needs of the homeless are considered above all else.

The simplest version of Khalili's Superadobe shelter used elongated bags filled with earth and held together with barbed wire; according to the Los Angeles Times, a basic structure could at the time be built for under US$500. The newspaper also noted limits to the system's adoption in the United States: some prototypes did not satisfy important building-code requirements and were difficult to combine with standardized cabinets and household appliances. Khalili nevertheless promoted the method primarily for emergency housing and for communities with limited access to conventional building materials.

In February 2000, Khalili designed a prototype of a lunar colony made with all-natural materials near the Mojave Desert.

He died March 5, 2008, in Los Angeles of congestive heart failure. After his death, his children Dastan and Sheefteh have continued the legacy of his work.

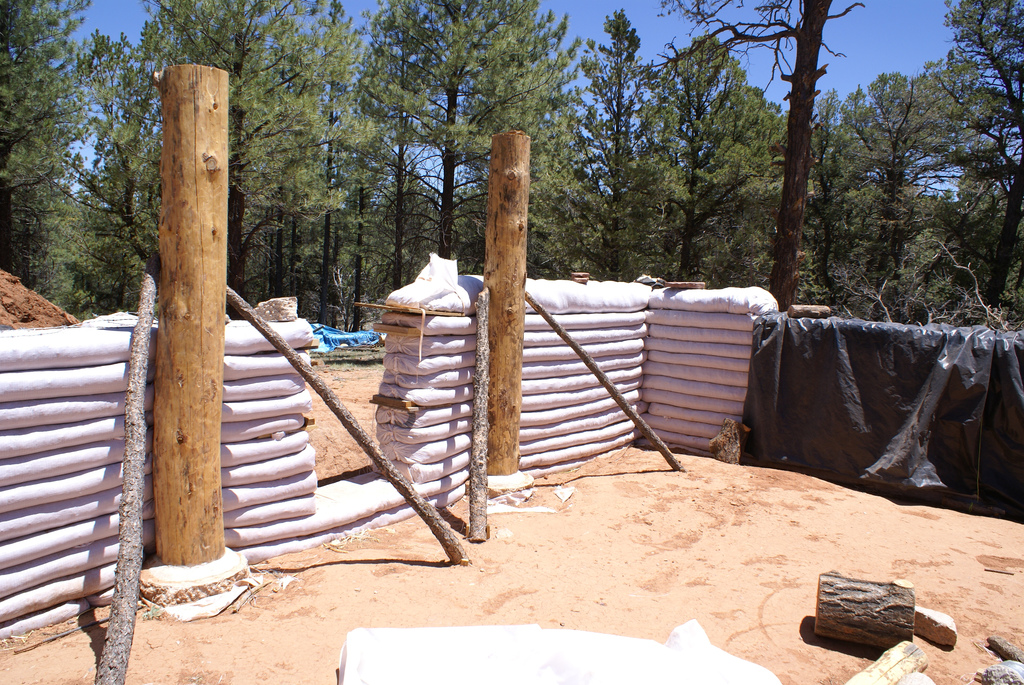
Superadobe construction

== Awards ==
In 1984, Khalili received the award for “Excellence in Technology” from the California Council of the American Institute of Architects (CCAIA) for his innovative Ceramic House System. In 1987 he received a Certificate of Special Recognition from the U.N. International Year of Shelter for the Homeless and U.S. Department of Housing and Urban Development (HUD) for his project "Housing for the Homeless: Research and Education." In 2004 Khalili won the Aga Khan Award for Architecture for sandbag shelters built with Superadobe.

== Books by Khalili ==
Khalili wrote books on his architectural philosophy & techniques as well as translations of poetry from Rumi, the poet he considered instrumental in his design inspiration.

- Khalili, Nader (1983). Racing Alone: A Visionary Architect's Quest for Houses Made with Earth and Fire. Harper & Row. ISBN 9780062504456.
- Khalili, Nader (1986). Ceramic Houses and Earth Architecture: How to Build Your Own. Cal Earth Press. ISBN 9780062504470.
- Khalili, Nader (2002). Sidewalks on the Moon: The Journey of a Mystic Architect Through Tradition, Technology, and Transformation. Cal-Earth Press. ISBN 9781889625027.
- Khalili, Nader (2018). The Spiritual Poems of Rumi. Book Sales. ISBN 9781577151678.
- Rumi, Fountain of Fire
- Rumi, Dancing the Flame

== See also ==
- Yasmeen Lari
