= Earthbag construction =

Building method

Earthbag construction is an inexpensive building method using mostly local soil to create structures which are both strong and can be quickly built.

== Earthbag development ==
=== Features ===
It is a natural building technique developed from historic military bunker construction techniques and temporary flood-control dike building methods. The technique requires very basic construction materials: sturdy sacks filled with organic material usually available on site.

Standard earthbag fill material has internal stability. Either moist subsoil that contains enough clay to become cohesive when tamped, or a water-resistant angular gravel or crushed volcanic rock is used. Walls are gradually built up by laying the bags in courses—forming a staggered pattern similar to bricklaying.

The walls can be curved or straight, domed with earth or topped with conventional roofs. Curved walls provide good lateral stability, forming round rooms and/or domed ceilings like an igloo.

Buildings with straight walls longer than 5 m (16.4 ft) in length need intersecting walls or bracing buttresses. International standards exist for bracing wall size and spacing for earthen construction in different types of seismic risk areas, most notably the performance-based standards of New Zealand recommended by the ASTM International's earth building standards. Static shear testing shows that earthbag can reach similar strengths to New Zealand's reinforced adobe standards with specific soil strengths and reinforcement although unreinforced weak soil earthbag can have lower shear strength than unreinforced adobe.

To improve friction between bags and wall tensile strength barbed wire is usually placed between courses. Twine is also sometimes wrapped around the bags to tie one course to the next, to hold in-progress structures together and keep courses well-seated on barbed wire prongs. Rebar can be hammered into walls to strengthen corners and opening edges and provide resistance against overturning.

The structure is typically finished with plaster, either cement stucco on a strong mesh layer or an adobe or lime plaster, to shed water and prevent fabric UV damage. Finishes can differ from protected interior applications to exposed external applications.

This construction technique is one of the most versatile natural building methods and can be used for benches, freestanding walls, emergency shelters, temporary or permanent housing, or barns and commercial buildings. Earthbag is frequently chosen for many small-to-medium-sized institutional structures in the developing world. Subgrade structures including underground and bermed dwellings (such as Earthships), cisterns, spring boxes, root cellars, and retaining walls can be built with stabilized soil fill or with additional reinforcement and water-resistant gravel or sand fill.

=== Writers ===
Although Joseph Kennedy probably invented the term earthbag (as well as contained earth), Paulina Wojciechowska wrote the first book on the topic of earthbag building in 2001, Building with Earth: A Guide to Flexible-Form Earthbag Construction. Kelly Hart developed a massive online database of earthbag information that encouraged idea sharing. Kaki Hunter and Doni Kiffmeyer worked on a variety of projects after studying with Khalili, calling earthbag "flexible form rammed earth". Their 2004 book, Earthbag Building: the Tools, Tricks and Techniques, is available as an e-book.

Free online booklets have been developed by different authors, including Owen Geiger and Patti Stouter. These include structural research and field testing techniques developed for rural areas.

A 2011 e-book by Geiger, Earthbag Building Guide: Vertical Walls Step-by-Step, provides photo illustrations of the process and discussions of new techniques for low-risk areas.

=== Proponents ===
Many like Akio Inoue, from Tenri University in Japan and Scott Howard of Earthen Hand have tested and built buildings. Hart, with Geiger, encouraged earthbag's development into different culturally and climatically-appropriate shapes. Robert Shear built an earthship inspired earthbag house in Utah and Morgan Caraway of Sustainable Life School is building a house that incorporates earthship design principles as well.

While Gernot Minke, the German professor of earthen architecture, first developed a technique of using bags filled with pumice to build walls, architect and builder Nader Khalili helped reintroduce earthbag construction as a modern technique called superadobe for humanitarian efforts (particularly for residential buildings) as well as natural flood control.

Dr. John Anderton of South Africa has tested a triple channel bag version that reduces the slumping problems inherent in non-cohesive fill material like sand, and pioneered work in a narrow wall contained sand system which he calls E-khaya.

Fernando Pacheco of Brazil pioneered the use of lighter HDPE mesh tubing for simpler hyperadobe walls.

Rebuilding after natural disasters and in low-income regions around the world has included earthbag. Although heavy earthen walls are usually dangerous in quakes, Nepal's spring 2015 earthquakes left earthbag buildings in good condition near destroyed buildings.

Engineer Nabil Taha developed the first general specifications for one type of exterior pinning reinforcement appropriate for the highest seismic risk zones. Several engineering students have tested uncured or low strength earthbag, and Build Simple has tested cured cohesive walls. Organizations building in Nepal are currently working with engineers to improve and refine reinforcement options for seismic-resistant earthbag.

== Construction method ==
Timelapse video of an earthbag building being made

Construction usually begins by digging a trench to undisturbed mineral subsoil, which is partially filled with stones and/or gravel to create a rubble trench foundation. In high seismic risk regions a reinforced concrete footing or grade beam may be recommended. Earthbag buildings can also be built on conventional concrete slabs (though this is more expensive and uses more embodied energy than a rubble trench foundation) and can have a bermed or underground "floating" foundation like an earthship as well.

Several courses of gravel in doubled woven bags form a water-resistant foundation. Each layer usually has two strands of barbed wire on top, that attaches to the bag to prevent slippage and resists any tendency for the outward expansion of dome or rectangular walls.

Bags on the course above are offset by 200 mm (8 in)—half of the 450 mm (18 in) wall width—similar to running bond in masonry. Bags can either be pre-filled with material and hoisted up, or bags or tubes are filled in place. The weight of the earthen fill locks the bag in place on the barbed wire below. A light tamping of the bags or tubes consolidates the moist clay-containing fill and creates interlocking bags or tubes anchored on the barbed wire.

=== Container types ===
Solid-weave polypropylene is most popular, available around the world to transport rice or other grains. Polypropylene is low cost and resists water damage, rot, and insects. Tubes are often available from manufacturers who sew them into bags. Mesh tubes of soft crocheted poly fibers are also used, although stiff extruded mesh or woven mesh bags can also be used.

Organic/natural materials such as hemp, burlap (like "gunny sacks") can be used. Since these may rot, they should only be used with cohesive fills (containing a significant proportion of clay) that form solid masses when tamped.

=== Terminology ===
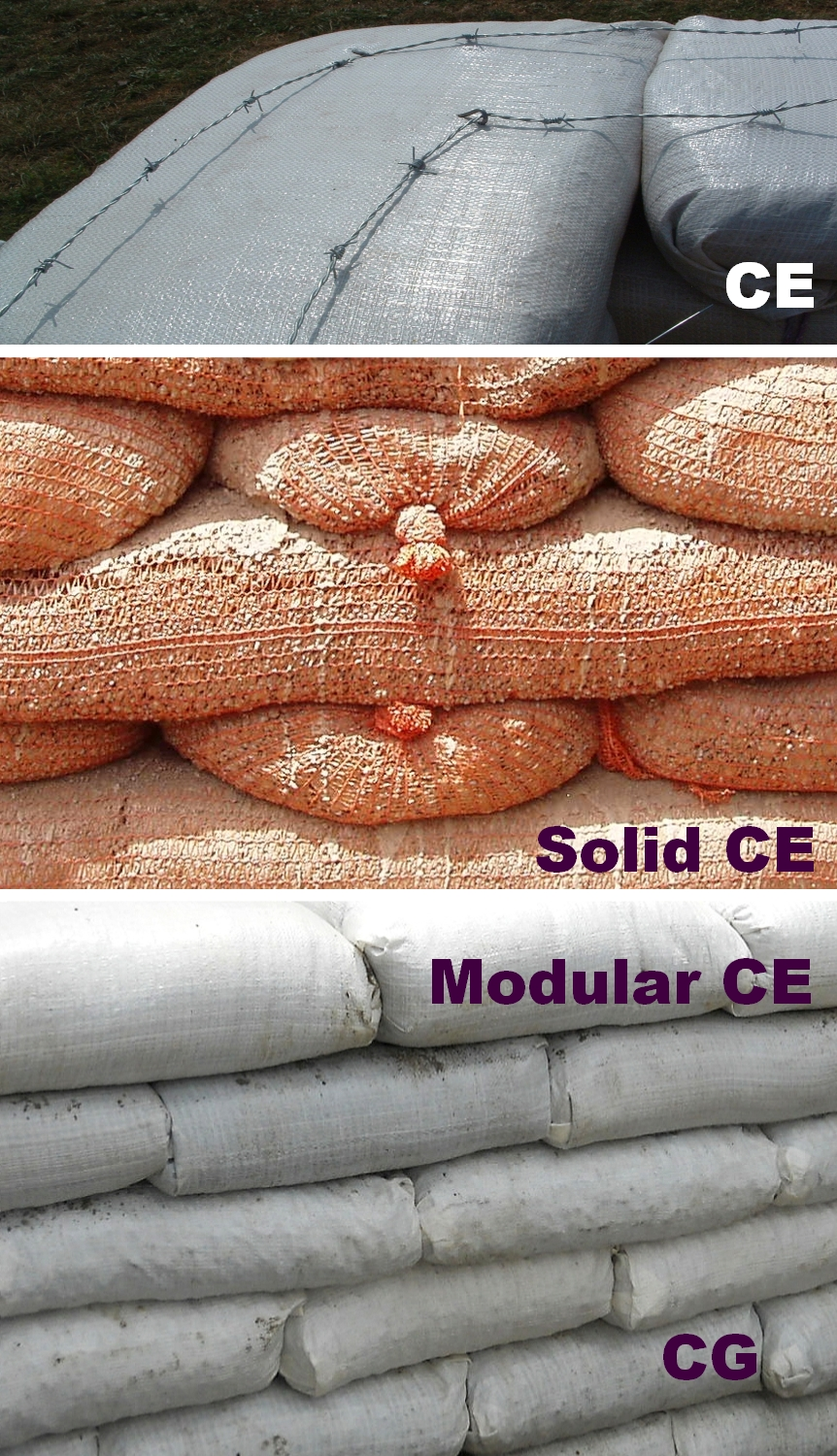
Types of contained earth

Earthbag is now a varied family of techniques. Each type of fill and container has different strength and reinforcement requirements.

For hazardous locations, accurate terminology is needed. Contained earth (CE) is based on the original technique, but with specific soil strengths and reinforcement chosen for hazard levels. CE uses damp, cohesive, tamped bag fill, which bonds strongly with barbed wire and other reinforcement as the wall cures.

CE is not "sandbags". Contained sand (CS) uses sand fill or any fill too dry or with poor cohesion that performs structurally like sandbags. CS must be built with solid-weave fabric bags and have good protection from fabric damage, relying on the strength of the bag fabric for wall strength. CS needs more vertical reinforcement for both shear and out-of-plane strength than CE, or may require a structural skin. Some builders use narrow bags of contained sand as wall infill.

Contained gravel (CG) uses fill of any aggregate larger than coarse sand, usually in doubled rice bags, although strong mesh can be used. CG limits dampness transmission from footings.

Modular CE is built in grain bags or similar tubes. Walls rely on attachment between barbed wire barbs and/ or added pins between courses. Solid CE is hyperadobe built in some type of knit raschel mesh tube, so that the damp earthen fill solidifies between courses.

=== Bag-fill materials ===
Generally inorganic material is used as filler, but some organic material (such as rice hulls) can be used if a strong matrix like wire mesh reinforces the plaster.

Earthen fill may contain 5–50% clay, and can be "reject fines", "road base", "engineered fill", or local subsoil. "Raw" or un-stabilized soils cure as solid units but cannot withstand prolonged soaking. Subsoils with clay mold tightly and attach well to barbed wire prongs and rebar.

Soil fill can contain a high proportion of aggregate, as long as it tamps and cures strongly. Crushed bottles, strong rubble, or plastic trash can be used, but high aggregate mixes may interfere with inserting rebar.

Sands, stone dust and gravels can survive prolonged flood conditions, but most require special bracing during construction as well as some form of structural skin. Sand fill may be appropriate for several courses to provide a vibration damping building base, but becomes unstable in ordinary bags above 60–100 cm (24–39 in) in height.

Cement, lime or bitumen stabilization can allow clay soil to withstand flooding or allow sands to be used in traditional bags with a non-structural plaster skin. Because earthbag walls are usually 38 cm (15 in) thick a large amount of stabilizer is needed.

Thermal insulating properties are important for climates that experience temperature extremes. The thermal insulating value of a material is directly related to both the porosity of the material and the thickness of the wall. Crushed volcanic rock, pumice or rice hulls yield higher insulation value than clay or sand. Untreated organic materials that could decay should not be used as part of a structural wall, although they can be used as infill.

United Earth Builders has tried a light straw clay in the hyperadobe mesh tubing to form a layer 200 mm (8") thick outside of a dome.

Thermal mass properties of earthen fill moderate temperature swings in climates that experience high temperature fluctuations from night to day. This thermal flywheel effect makes massive earth walls ideal for mild or hot and dry climates. Clay or sand also have excellent heat retention characteristics and, when properly insulated from the home's exterior, can serve as thermal mass in a passive solar building design in cool climates, keeping interior temperatures stable year-round.

=== Reinforcement and structural performance ===
Solid CE may be built with less barbed wire in low-risk areas because walls solidify between courses. Earthbag using woven bags or tubes need barbed wire for any level of natural hazard since the bag-to-bag surfaces are slippery. Pins between courses do not contribute important linear out-of-plane strength. Walls of earthbag with barbed wire are more flexible than adobe and may resist collapse when carefully detailed.

Earthbag of weak soil with no steel can be half the shear strength of unreinforced adobe, which is easily damaged in earthquakes. New Zealand's code detailing and plans allow unreinforced adobe walls to survive almost 0.6 g forces (comparable to Ss values for 2% probability of excedance in 50 years), but earthbag needs stronger soil to match this strength. Earthbag in Nepal surpassed this strength slightly by resisting forces above 0.7 g in early 2015. Domes tested in California resisted approximately 1 g forces, due to the stable shape of these less than 7 m (23 ft) diameter buildings.

Current earthbag techniques of inserting rebar unattached to base and overlapping without connection may only resist 1.2 g or less, even if using very strong soil. Special reinforcement is needed

Solid CE of strong soil has higher shear and out of plane strength than modular CE. It may also allow the use of mesh for horizontal reinforcement in addition to or in place of barbed wire.

Contained gravel or contained sand may perform best with wire wrapped around the sides of straight wall sections, alternating with the next course having barbed wire gift-wrapped under and over the same straight sections. Base walls of CG in high risk regions may need additional buttresses at the foundation level where builders cannot afford a reinforced concrete (RC) grade beam or footing. A narrower plastic mesh tube often used for erosion control wattle could be filled with gravel to allow a half-width RC ring beam under the wide walls.

=== Forming the house ===
A roof can be formed by gradually sloping the walls inward to construct a dome. Vaulted roofs can be built on forms. Or a bond beam is used under a traditional roof type. Hip roofs, gable-type trusses or vigas may be needed to reduce outward stress on earthen walls.

Earth domes are inexpensive to build, but waterproofing them is complex or expensive in humid regions.

Windows and doors can be formed with a traditional masonry lintel or with corbeling or brick-arch techniques, on temporary forms. Light may also be brought in by skylights, glass-capped pipes, or bottles placed between bag courses during construction.

=== Finishing ===
Cover the wall to prevent damage to the bags from UV rays or moisture with cement-based stucco, or lime or earthen plaster. If walls are 'raw' earth, an infill plaster of earth with straw is used to fill the nooks between bags or courses. A finish plaster is applied on top.

Roof overhangs are helpful to reduce plaster waterproofing requirements, although plaster on lower walls may be stronger and more water-resistant than plaster on upper walls.

Some buildings use a planted-earth "living roof" ("green-roof") to top the structure, while others use a more conventional framing and roof placed atop earth-bag walls.

== Environmental friendliness ==
Earthbag construction uses very little energy compared to other durable construction methods. Unlike concrete, brick or wood, no energy is needed to produce the earthen fill other than gathering soil. If on-site soil is used, little energy is needed for transportation. Unlike rammed earth construction, only human labor energy is required to tamp the soil lightly. The energy-intensive materials that are used – plastic (for bags & twine), steel wire, and perhaps the outer shell of plaster or stucco – are used in relatively small quantities compared to other types of construction, often totaling less than 5% of the building materials. Buildings last a long time when maintained. However, if "raw" or unstabilized soil is used as fill, when the building is no longer useful the earthen fill can be recycled into either garden areas, backfill, or new earthen buildings.

== Use in disaster areas ==
Earthbag building techniques were also explored in Sri Lanka after the 2004 tsunami. Multiple earthbag construction projects have been completed in Haiti, most of these after the earthquake. First Steps Himalaya and other charities had built more than 50 earthbag buildings in Nepal prior to the April 2015 earthquake. Since then, local builders flocked to ongoing earthbag training opportunities, including those by Good Earth Global, which have led to official Nepal building code acceptance of this technique for residences. International NPOs have built hundreds of contained earth or earthbag buildings in Nepal as well, more residences than larger clinics or schools. NPOs are asking for more structural information to be better able to choose reinforcement types and intensity appropriate to local soil strength and seismic risk. University testing has begun but more is needed.

== Colonization of the Moon and Mars ==
Khalili proposed using the techniques of earthbag construction for building structures on the Moon or other planets. Currently, it is quite expensive to lift a positive-mass payload from Earth. Thus, Khalili's techniques would seem to be an ideal solution as the requisite supplies would consist of lightweight bags and a few tools to fill them. He specified that such bags would probably have pre-sewn "hook and loop" (i.e. Velcro) fastener strips in lieu of barbed wire.

== See also ==
- Earth structure
- Rice-hull bagwall construction
- Green roof
- Natural building
- Super Adobe
- Gabion
- Cellular confinement (geocell)
