= Fusheng Insulation Materials =

Chinese insulation material company

PPGFS
- Type: Private
- Founded: 2005
- Headquarters: Huizhou
- Key people: Moore Jr. Thomas Ross (chairman)
- Website: www.ppgfs.com

Fusheng Insulation Materials
- Chinese: 富盛绝缘材料
- Parent: Precision Products Group

Fusheng Insulation Materials, also referred to as PPGFS, fully known as Huizhou Fusheng Insulation Materials Co., Ltd., is a Chinese insulation material manufacturing company founded in 2005. It is a subsidiary of the Indianapolis-based Precision Products Group (PPG). It mainly manufactures plastic products. It specializes in precision spiral winding technology, especially the manufacture of polyimide tubing products.

According to Simon & Schuster, Fusheng Insulation Materials is an overseas entity owned by the U.S. company Stone Industrial. The Stone company, now rebranded as PPG, is a producer of plastic tubing. The Fusheng company's products are mainly used in the medical application, consumer electronic, and automotive industries. Information from Tianyancha shows that Moore Jr. Thomas Ross is the legal representative of PPGFS.

== History ==
PPGFS's parent company was initially named Stone Straw, which was established in 1888. In 2005, Fusheng Insulation Materials was formed in China by the then-named Stone Industrial.

In 2006, Fusheng Insulation Materials and PPG jointly set up a production line in Huizhou. In 2008, the company was injected with HK$8.4 million by Precision Products Group International Limited.
