= City Repair Project =

U.S. nonprofit organization

- Formation: 1996; 30 years ago
- Founded at: Portland, Oregon
- Purpose: Community education and activism
- Coordinates: 45°31′12″N 122°40′55″W
- Board of directors: Brent Bellamy, Sarah Frances Micaelson Lakeman, Todd Ferry, Mark Michaelson Lakeman
- Website: cityrepair.org

The City Repair Project is a 501(c)(3) non-profit organization based in Portland, Oregon. Its focus is education and activism for community building. The organizational motto is "The City Repair Project is group of citizen activists creating public gathering places and helping others to creatively transform the places where they live."

== Structure ==
City Repair is an organization primarily run by volunteers. A board of directors oversees the project's long-term vision, and a council maintains its daily operations. Both the board of directors and council meet monthly. City Repair's work focuses on localization and placemaking. The City Repair Project maintains an office in Portland.

== History ==
The City Repair Project was founded in 1996 by a small group of neighbors interested in sustainability and neighborhood activism. The first City Repair action was an intersection repair at Share-It Square at SE 9th Ave and SE Sherrett Street. An intersection repair is a place where two streets crossed that is painted by the members of that neighborhood. The street is closed down during the painting. The first intersection repair that happened was at Share-it Square. Other intersection repairs include Sunnyside Piazza.

== Annual events ==
City Repair hosts two events annually, Portland's Earth Day celebration and the Village Building Convergence.

Past projects include the T-Horse, a small pick-up truck converted into a mobile tea house. The T-Horse was driven to neighborhood sites and events around Portland and served free chai and pie.

The organization has inspired groups around the United States to start their own City Repair Projects. Unaffiliated City Repairs exist in California, Washington, Minnesota, and other places.

The Village Building Convergence (VBC) is an annual 10-day event held every May in Portland, Oregon, United States. The event is coordinated by the City Repair Project and consists of a series of workshops incorporating natural building and permaculture design at multiple sites around the city. Many of the workshops center on "intersection repairs" which aim to transform street intersections into public gathering spaces.

=== Background ===
In 1996, neighbors in the Sellwood neighborhood of Portland at the intersection of 8th and Sherrett created a tea stand, children's playhouse and community library on the corner and renamed it "Share-It Square". Community organizers founded the City Repair Project that same year, seeking to share their vision with the community. In January 2000, the Portland City Council passed ordinance #172207, an "Intersection Repair" ordinance, allowing neighborhoods to develop public gathering places in certain street intersections.

=== Sites ===
The first Village Building Convergence took place in May 2002, then called the Natural Building Convergence. During its history, the VBC has coordinated the creation of over 72 natural building and permaculture sites in Portland, including information kiosks, painted intersections, cob benches, and a strawbale house at Dignity Village. The sites are primarily located in the southeast quadrant of Portland. Natural builders from around the world have coordinated the activities at many of the construction sites at the Village Building Convergence. Most of the labor taking place at the sites is done by volunteers.

=== Workshops ===
The VBC hosts a series of workshops, many of which are free to the public. Topics of the workshops are usually related to sustainability and natural building. Past workshops have included aikido lessons, outdoor mushroom cultivation, bioswale creation, and nonviolent communication.

=== Speakers ===
The VBC also hosts speakers and entertainment during the evenings of its convergences. Presentations for the 2007 convergence were made at Disjecta by Starhawk, Michael Lerner, and Paul Stamets. Prior years' presentations have been given by Malik Rahim, Toby Hemenway, and Judy Bluehorse.
