= Natural building =

Sustainable construction practice

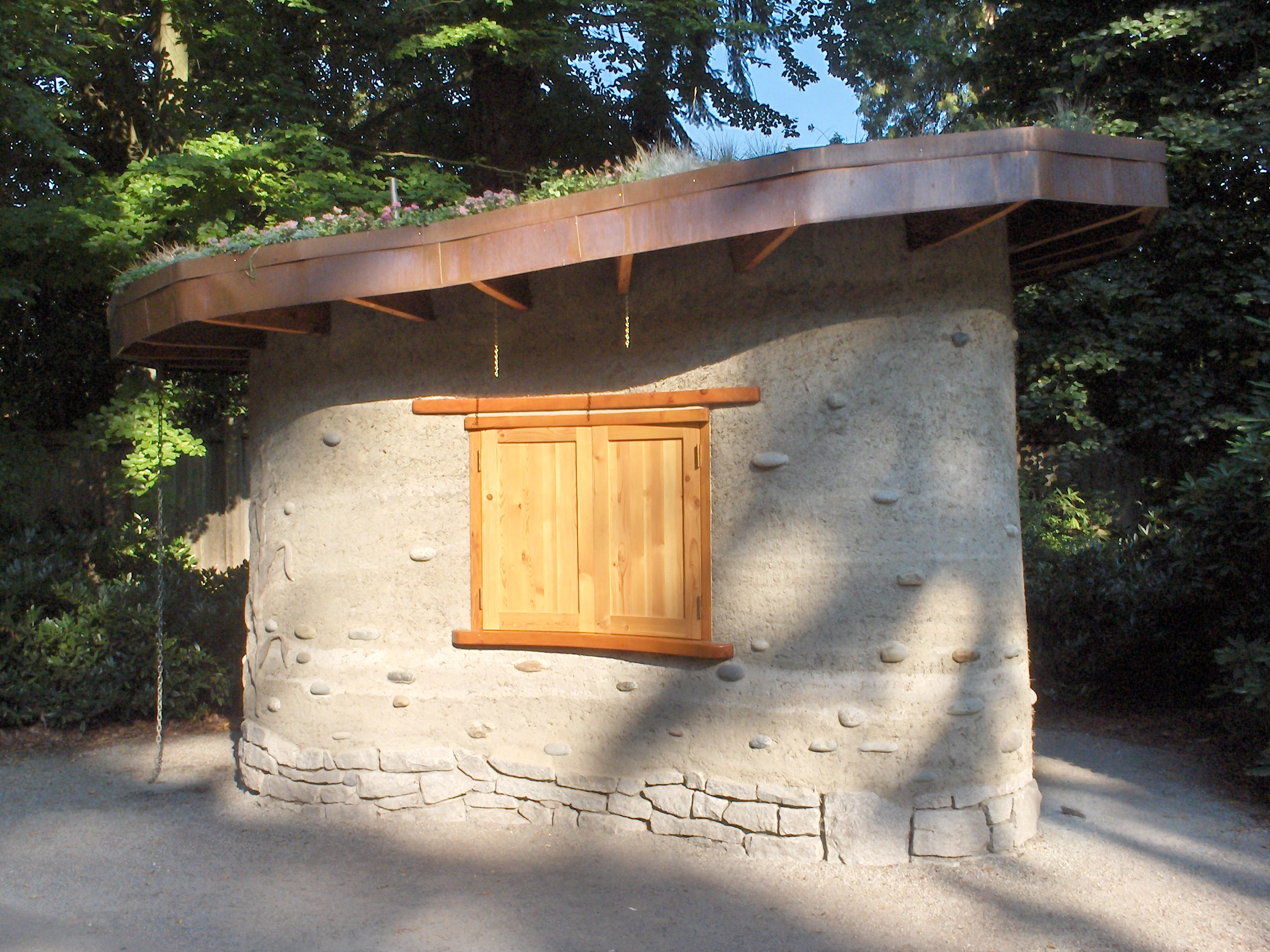
A small cob building with a living roof

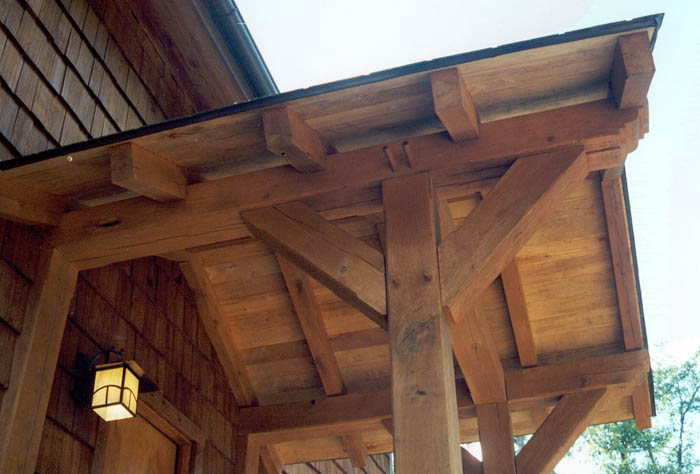
Porch of a modern timber framed home

Natural building or ecological building is a discipline within the more comprehensive scope of green building, sustainable architecture as well as sustainable and ecological design that promotes the construction of buildings using sustainable processes and locally available natural materials.

This in turn implies durability and the use of minimally processed, plentiful or renewable resources, as well as those that, while recycled or salvaged, produce healthy living environments and maintain indoor air quality. Natural building tends to rely on human labor, more than technology. As Michael G. Smith observes, it depends on "local ecology, geology and climate; on the character of the particular building site, and on the needs and personalities of the builders and users."

The basis of natural building is the need to lessen the environmental impact of buildings and other supporting systems, without sacrificing comfort or health. To be more sustainable, natural building uses primarily abundantly available, renewable, reused or recycled materials. The use of rapidly renewable materials is increasingly a focus. In addition to relying on natural building materials, the emphasis on the architectural design is heightened. The orientation of a building, the utilization of local climate and site conditions, the emphasis on natural ventilation through design, fundamentally lessen operational costs and positively impact the environment. Building compactly and minimizing the ecological footprint is common, as are on-site handling of energy acquisition, on-site water capture, alternate sewage treatment and water reuse.

== Materials ==
The materials common to many types of natural building are clay and sand. When mixed with water and, usually, straw or another fiber, the mixture may form cob or adobe (clay blocks). Other materials commonly used in natural building are: earth (as rammed earth or earth bag), wood (cordwood or timber frame/post-and-beam), straw, rice-hulls, bamboo and stone. A wide variety of reused or recycled materials are common in natural building, including urbanite (salvaged chunks of used concrete), vehicle windscreens and other recycled glass, which can be toxic in nature.

Other materials are avoided by practitioners of this building approach, due to their major negative environmental or health impacts. These include unsustainably harvested wood, toxic wood-preservatives, Portland cement-based mixes and derived products such as Autoclaved aerated concrete, paints and other coatings that off-gas volatile organic compounds (VOCs), steel, waste materials such as rubber tires in regions where they are recycled, and some plastics; particularly polyvinyl chloride (PVC or "vinyl") and those containing harmful plasticizers or hormone-mimicking formulations.

== Earth techniques ==
=== Adobe ===
One of the oldest building methods, adobe is simply clay and sand mixed with water. Often, chopped straw or other fibers are added for strength. The mixture is then allowed to dry in the desired shape. Usually adobe is shaped into bricks that can be stacked to form walls.

Various claims are made about the optimal proportions of clay and sand (or larger aggregate). Some say that the best adobe soil contains 15% - 30% clay to bind the material together. Others say equal proportions of clay and sand are best to prevent cracking or fragmenting of the bricks. The blocks can either be poured into molds and dried, or pressed into blocks. Adobe colored with clay and polished with natural oil makes an attractive and resilient floor.

To protect the walls and reduce maintenance, adobe buildings usually have large overhanging eaves and sizeable foundations. Adobe can be plastered over with cob or lime-based mixes for both appearance and protection. Adobe has good thermal mass, meaning that it is slow to transmit heat or cold. It is not a good insulator, however, so insulation can be added (preferably on the outside), or a double wall built with airspace or insulation in between. The traditional thick, un-insulated adobe has proven to perform best in regions without harsh winters or where daily sun is predictably available during those cold periods.

=== Cob ===
The term cob is used to describe a monolithic building system based on a mixture of clay, sand, straw and earth. The construction uses no forms, bricks or wooden framework; it is built from the ground up. Various forms of "mud" building have been used in many parts of the world for centuries, under a variety of names, and date from at least 10,000 years ago. Cob building began use in England prior to the 13th century, and fell out of favor after World War I, although it is seeing a resurgence today. Cob is one of the simplest and least expensive building techniques available, though it is typically very labor-intensive. Cob's other great advantage is versatility; It can easily be shaped into any form.

While cob building was falling out of favor in England by the late 19th century, thousands of cob structures have endured to the present (20,000 in Devon, England alone). It is estimated that from one third to one half of the world's population lives in earthen dwellings today. Although typically associated with "low-rise" structures, in Yemen and other Middle-Eastern countries it has, for centuries, been used in "apartment" buildings of eight stories and more.

=== Rammed earth ===
Rammed earth is a wall system made of compacted earth, or another material that is compacted. It is extremely strong and durable. Quality rammed earth walls are dense, solid, and stone-like with great environmental benefits and superior low maintenance characteristics. As an option depending on climate rigid insulation can be placed inside the wall. Similarly, depending on seismic concerns bamboo or other tensile natural materials can be used to reinforce the wall.

Rammed earth has been used for around 10,000 years in all types of buildings from low rise to high-rise and from small huts to palaces.

Rammed earth walls are formed in place by pounding damp sub-soil (containing sand, clay and sometimes gravel) into movable, reusable forms with manual or machine-powered tampers. In traditional rammed earth, a mixture of around 70% aggregate (gravel, sand) and 30% clay is optimal. Pigmentation may be added in the mix to achieve the desired color. Around 5-10 inches of mixed damp sub-soil are placed inside the forms and pounded to total compaction and the process is repeated until the desired height is achieved. What is left after the forms are removed is a wall that is structural and can last over 1000 years.

== Plant-based material techniques ==
=== Timber frame ===
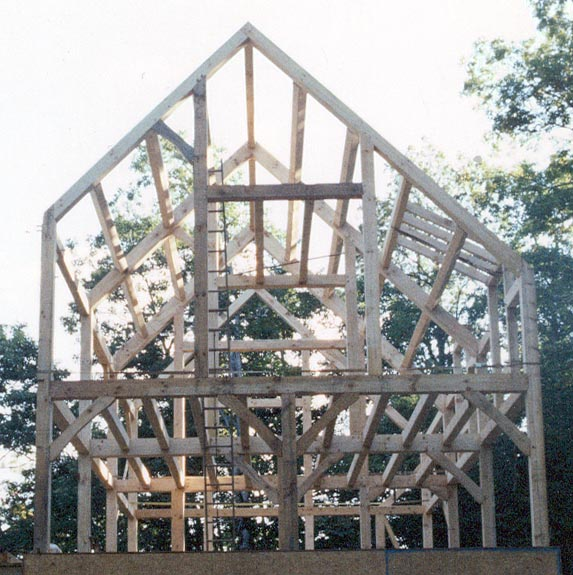
The completed frame of a modern timber-frame home

The basic elements of timber-frame building—joined timbers, clay walls and thatch roofs were in place in Europe and Asia by the 9th century. It remained the common mode of house construction in northern cultures until the 19th century. Craftsmanship was, and is, an important value in timber-frame building. The oldest timber-frame structures (for example, the timber framed stave churches of Scandinavia) show both craftsmanship and a strong grasp of the technical aspects of structural design, as do such structures in Japan.

Timber framing typically uses a "bent." A bent is a structural support, like a truss, consisting of two posts, a tie beam and two rafters. These are connected into a framework through joinery. To practice the craft, one must understand the basic structural aspects of the bent. This, along with a knowledge of joinery, are the basis of timber-frame building.

Timber framing is now a modern method of construction, Ideally suited to mass house building as well as public buildings. In conjunction with a number of natural insulations and timber cladding or modern lime renders, it is possible to quickly construct a high performance, sustainable building, using completely natural products. The benefits are many—the building performs better over its lifespan, waste is reduced (much can be re-cycled, composted or used as fuel). Timber-frame structures are frequently used in combination with other natural building techniques, such as cob, straw bale, or cordwood/masonry.

=== Bamboo ===
Bamboos are some of the fastest-growing plants in the world. Bamboo can be utilized as a building material for scaffolding, bridges, houses and buildings. Bamboo is a natural composite material with a high strength-to-weight ratio similar to timber, and its strength is generally similar to a strong softwood or hardwood timber. In its natural form, bamboo as a construction material is traditionally associated with the cultures of South Asia, East Asia, the South Pacific, Central and South America.

=== Straw bale ===
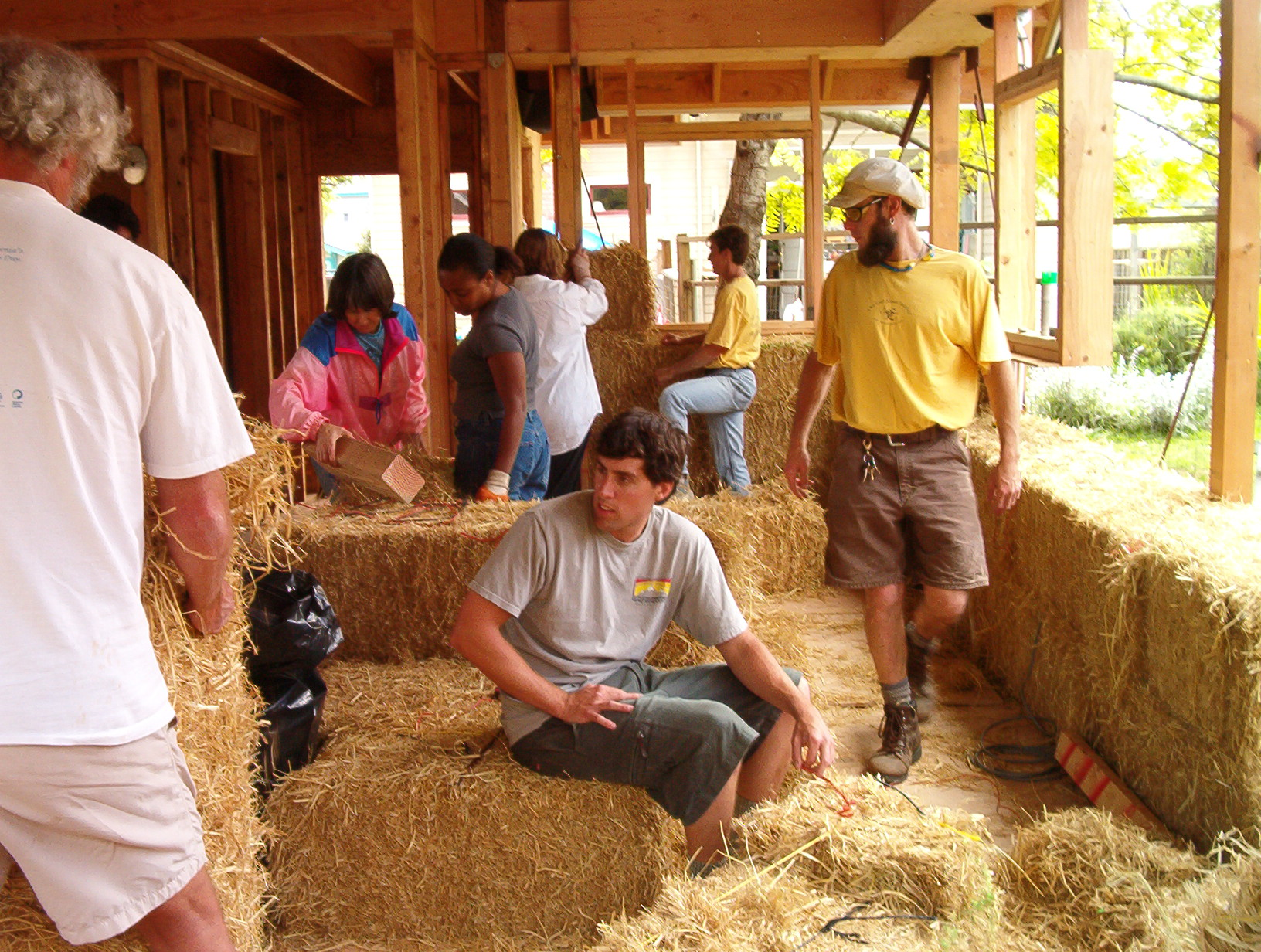
Straw bale construction in Santa Cruz, CA

Although grasses and straw have been in use in a range of ways in building since pre-history around the world, their incorporation in machine-manufactured modular bales seems to date back to the early 20th century in the midwestern United States, particularly the sand-hills of Nebraska, where grass was plentiful and other building materials (even quality sods) were not. Straw bale building typically consists of stacking a series of rows of bales (often in running-bond) on a raised footing or foundation, with a moisture barrier between. Bale walls are often tied together with pins of bamboo or wood (internal to the bales or on their faces), or with surface wire meshes, and then stuccoed or plastered using either lime-based formulations or earth/clay renders. Bale buildings can either have a structural frame of other materials, with bales between (simply serving as insulation and stucco substrate), referred to as "infill", or the bales may actually provide the support for openings and roof, referred to as "load-bearing" or "Nebraska-style", or a combination of framing and load-bearing may be employed, referred to a "hybrid" straw bale.

Typically, bales created on farms with mobile machinery have been used ("field-bales"), but recently higher-density "recompressed" bales (or "straw-blocks") are increasing the loads that may be supported; where field bales might support around 600 pounds per linear foot of wall, the high density bales bear up to 4,000 lb./lin.ft.

== Composite techniques ==
=== Earthbag ===
Earth is the most typical fill material used in bag-wall construction techniques. This building method utilizes stacked polypropylene or natural-fiber (burlap) bags filled with earth or other mixes without a stabilizer, other than clay, to form footings, foundations, walls and even vaulted or domed roofs. In recent years, building with earth bags has become one of the increasingly practiced techniques in natural building. It facilitates self-contained, often free-form rammed-earth structures. Its growing popularity relates to its use of an abundant and readily available often site-available material (earth) in a potentially inexpensive building technique that is flexible, and easy to learn and use. However, because earth is a poor insulator, in more extreme climates other filler variations are now being explored, substituting pumice, rice-hulls or another material with better insulating value for all or part of the earth (see also Rice-hull bagwall construction).

=== Hempcrete ===
Hempcrete or Hemplime is a composite building material, a mixture of the chopped woody stem of the hemp plant known as hemp hurds (shives) and a lime based binder to create a material that can be cast into molds. This forms a non-load-bearing 'breathable' insulating material that can be used to form walls, floor slabs, ceilings and roof insulation. It is marketed under names like Hempcrete, Canobiote, Canosmose, and Isochanvre. Hempcrete is easier to work with than traditional lime mixes and acts as an insulator and moisture regulator. It lacks the brittleness of concrete and consequently does not need expansion joints. The result is a lightweight insulating material ideal for most climates as it combines insulation and thermal mass.

Like other plant products, hemp absorbs CO_{2} from the atmosphere as it grows, retaining the carbon and releasing the oxygen. Theoretically 165 kg of carbon can be absorbed and locked up by 1 m^{3} of hempcrete wall during manufacture. Furthermore, the carbonation of the lime during curing adds to this effect as lime turns to limestone.

The typical compressive strength is around 1 MPa, around 1/20 that of residential grade concrete. It is a low density material and resistant to crack under movement thus making it highly suitable for use in earthquake-prone areas. Hempcrete walls must be used together with a frame of another material that supports the vertical load in building construction, as hempcrete's density is 15% that of traditional concrete.

=== Cordwood ===
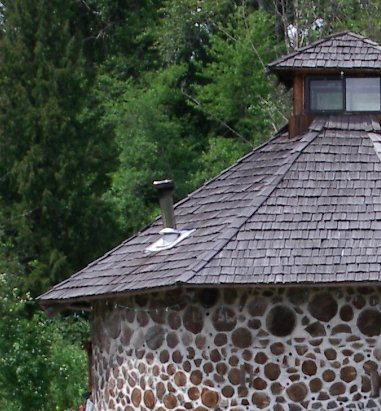
A section of a cordwood home

Cordwood construction is a natural building method in which "cordwood" or short lengths of pieces of debarked tree are laid up crosswise with masonry or cob mixtures to build a wall. The cordwood, thus, becomes infill for the walls, usually between posts in a timber frame structure. Cordwood masonry can be combined with other methods (e.g., rammed earth, cob or light clay) to produce attractive combinations. Cordwood masonry construction provides a relatively high thermal mass, which helps to minimize fluctuations in temperature.

== Stone ==
Stone has been used as a building material for thousands of years. It has long been recognized as a material of great durability. The pyramids in Giza, burial chambers in the UK and temples in Malta were all built from stone over 4000 years ago and are still standing. The earliest form of stone construction is known as dry stone, or dry stacking. These are freestanding structures such as field walls, bridges and buildings that use irregularly shaped stones carefully selected and placed so that they fit closely together without slipping. Structures are typically wider at the base and taper in as height increases. They do not require any special tools, only the skill of the craftsman in choosing and placing the stones.

Traditional stone masonry evolved from dry stone stacking. Stone blocks are laid in rows of even (courses) or uneven (un-coursed) height, and fixed in place with lime mortar pasted between the stones. Traditional stone masonry is rarely used today because stone is expensive to quarry, cut and transport, and the building process is labor and skill-intensive.

Stone is a highly durable, low maintenance building material with high thermal mass. It is versatile, available in many shapes, sizes, colors and textures, and can be used for floors, walls, arches and roofs. Stone blends well with the natural landscape, and can easily be recycled for other building purposes.

== See also ==
- Alternative natural materials
- Autonomous building
- Biophilic design
- Brownstone
- Building
- Earth structure
- Ecological design
- Engineered wood
- Green building and wood
- Green building
- Greystone (architecture)
- Helsinki Central Library Oodi
- Hemp as a building material
- Hempcrete
- Log house
- Recycling timber
- Renewable heat
- Self-sufficient homes
- Sustainable architecture
- Wattle and daub
- Yakhchāl
