= Rubble =

Broken stone of irregular sizes

Rubble is broken stone, of irregular size, shape and texture; undressed especially as a filling-in. Rubble naturally found in the soil is known also as 'brash' (compare cornbrash). Where present, it becomes more noticeable when the land is ploughed or worked.

== Building ==
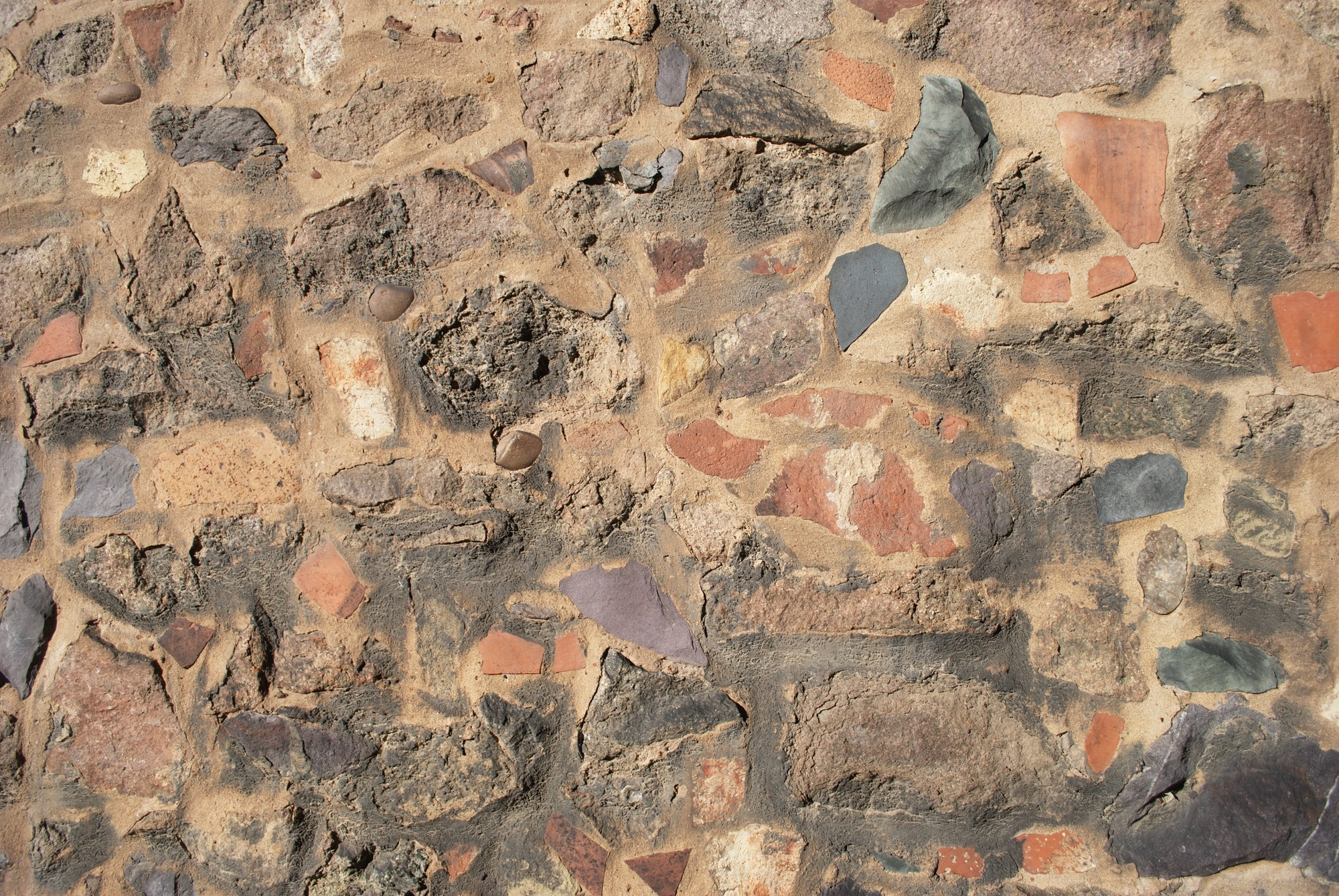
Rubble-work on Wyggeston's Chantry House in Leicester, built c. 1511

"Rubble-work" is a name applied to several types of masonry. One kind, where the stones are loosely thrown together in a wall between boards and grouted with mortar almost like concrete, is called in Italian "muraglia di getto" and in French "bocage". In Pakistan, walls made of rubble and concrete, cast in a formwork, are called 'situ', which probably derives from Sanskrit (similar to the Latin 'in situ' meaning 'on the spot').

Work executed with more or less large stones put together without any attempt at courses is called rubble walling. Where similar work is laid in courses, it is known as coursed rubble. Dry-stone walling is somewhat similar work done without the use of mortar. It is bound together by the fit of the stones and the regular placement of stones which extend through the thickness of the wall. A rubble wall built with mortar will be stronger if assembled in this way.

=== Rubble walls in Malta ===
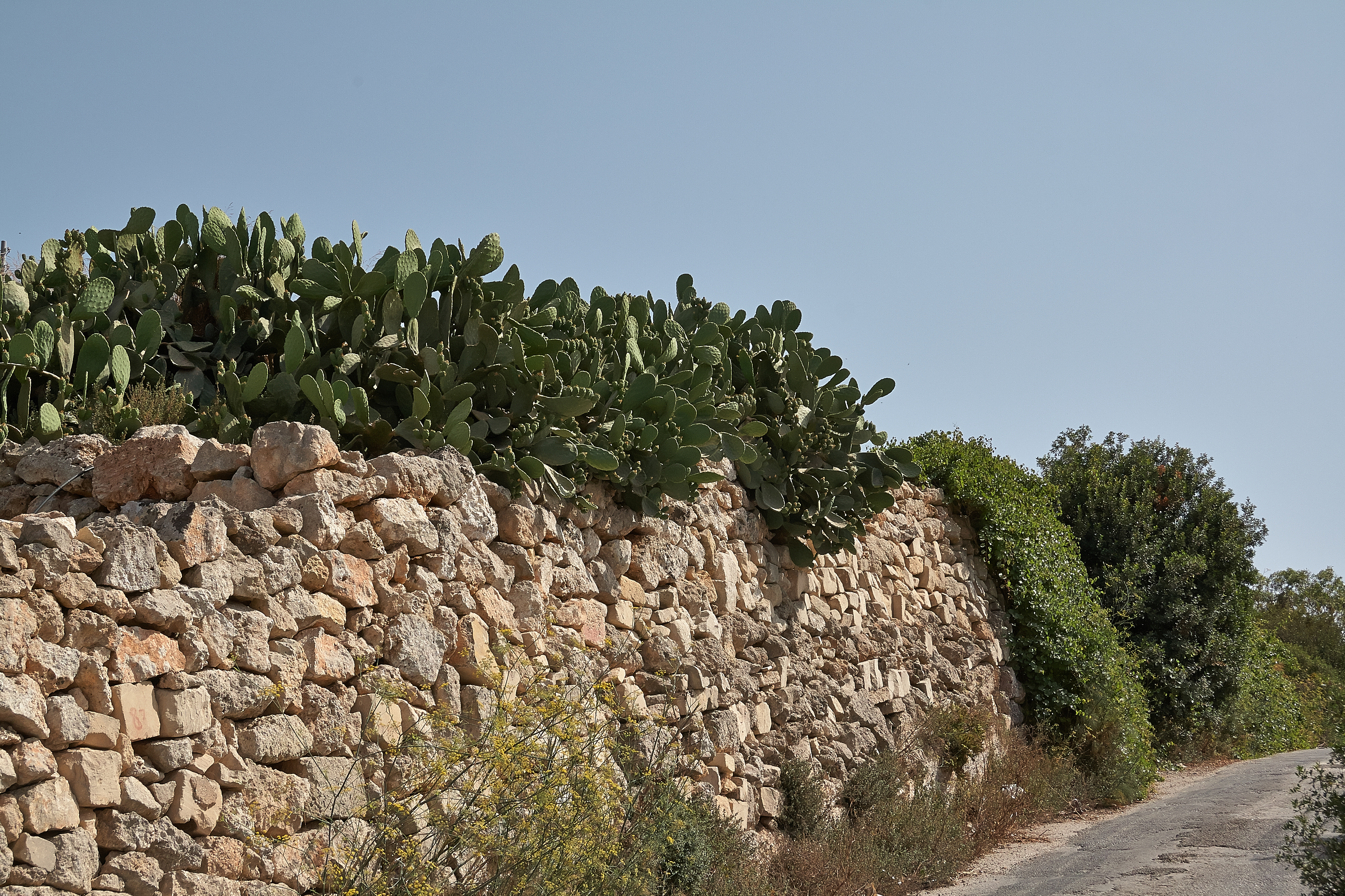
Rubble wall near Dingli, Malta

Rubble walls (Maltese: ħitan tas-sejjieħ) are found all over the island of Malta. Similar walls are also frequently found in Sicily and the Arab countries. The various shapes and sizes of the stones used to build these walls look like stones that were found in the area lying on the ground or in the soil. It is most probable that the practice of building these walls around the field was inspired by the Arabs during their rule in Malta, as in Sicily which was also ruled by the Arabs around the same period. Maltese farmers found that this method of building these walls was very efficient especially when resources were limited. Rubble walls are used to serve as borders between farms. A great advantage that rubble walls offered is that when heavy rain falls, their structure would allow excessive water to pass through and therefore, excess water will not ruin the products. Soil erosion is minimised as the wall structure allows the water to pass through but it traps the soil and prevents it from being carried away from the field. One can see many rubble walls on the side of the hills and in valleys where the land slopes down and consequently the soil is in greater danger of being carried away.

=== Rubble in Britain ===
In the British Islands, many mediaeval and post-mediaeval buildings are built of small natural stones, called rubble. As examples see the descriptions in two official list entries, provided by Historic England:

- No. 1191625 – Parish Church of the Holy Trinity, Chuckfield
- No. 1139238 – Church of St Mary, Longnewton, 1856/57

== See also ==
- Backfill – material used to refill a disused trench
- Blockfield – Surface covered by irregular rocks, a 'Boulder field'
- Core-and-veneer – Wall building technique
- Debris – Scattered remains of something destroyed or discarded
- Riprap – Rock or concrete protective armour
- Ruin – Remains of human-made architecture
- Rubble trench foundation – Foundation construction approach
