= Dignity Village =

Encampment in Portland, Oregon, United States

- Homeless encampment
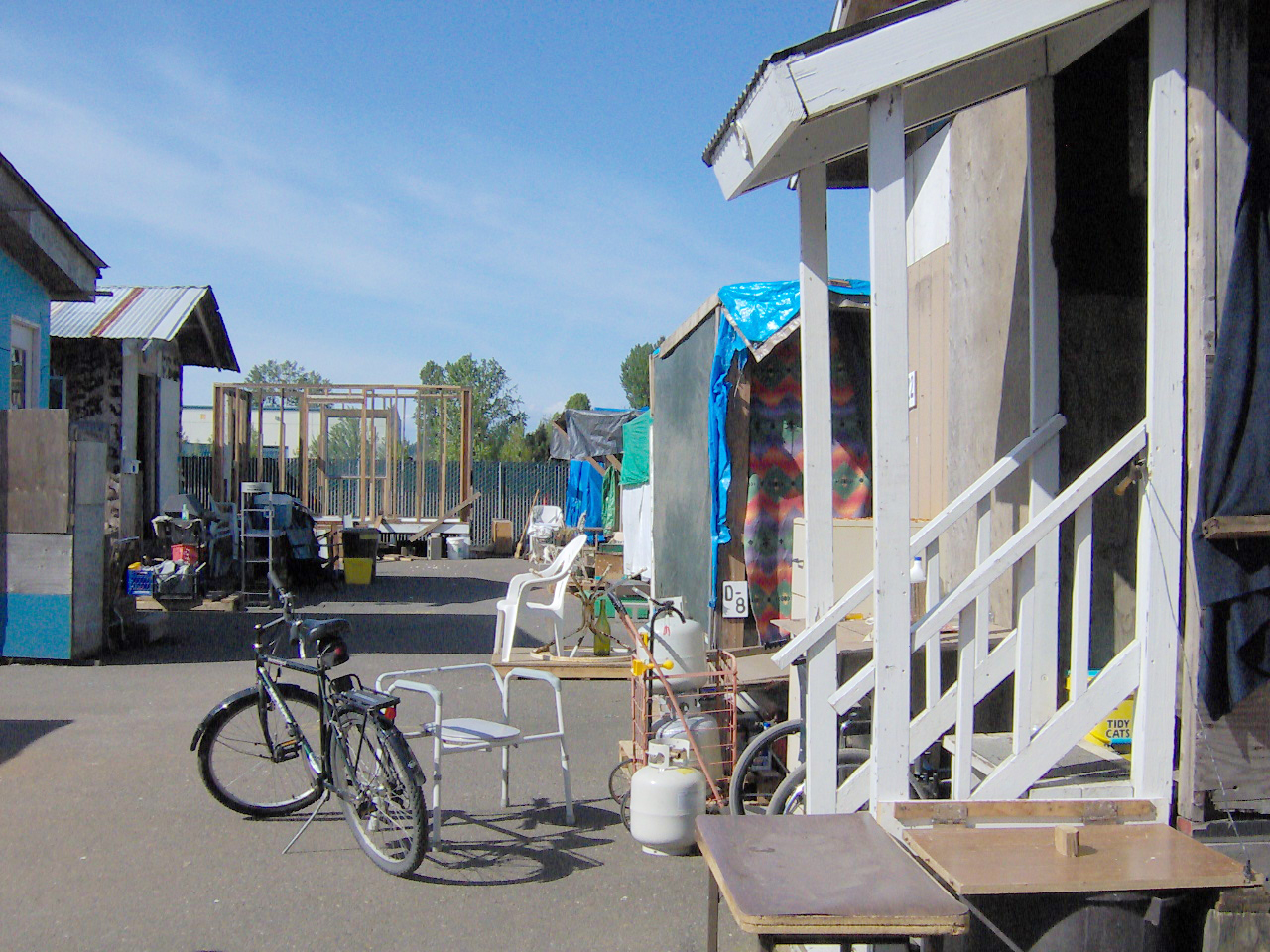
- Side street of Dignity Village

- Flag

- Location within Oregon
- Coordinates: 45.5914879°N 122.6361417°W
- Country: United States
- State: Oregon
- County: Multnomah
- City: Portland
- Founded: 2000

Population (2016)
  - Total: 60

Dignity Village is a city-recognized legal encampment of an estimated 60 homeless people in Portland, Oregon, United States. In the days before Christmas of 2000, a group of individuals living outdoors in Portland established a tent city. It evolved from a group of self-described "outsiders" squatting a city owned land to a self-regulating, city-recognized campground as defined by Portland city code. The encampment is located on land near Portland International Airport, and has elected community officials and constructed crude but functional cooking, social, electric, and sanitary facilities.

== History ==
Dignity Village was founded by eight houseless persons who pitched five tents on public land. The squatters then picked up significant media coverage and popular support. It was established in the Sunderland neighborhood near the Portland Airport. The group agreed to pay $2,000 in monthly rent, $17,500 per year for toilets and over $5,000 per year for garbage services.

Repeated attempts to shut down the campsite were rebuffed by the Portland City Council. It then guaranteed the community's existence through at least 2010. In March 2019, a tiny house exploded at the encampment from its occupant using a leaking propane tank inside the structure. The 8' x 10' structure was destroyed, according to firefighters. A man living in it was injured.

== Organization ==
Dignity Village is incorporated in Oregon as a 501(c)(3) membership-based non-profit organization, and is governed by bylaws and a board of directors with an elected chairman and other corporate officers.

Membership is by application review. Dignity Village states that membership is not limited "based on religion, race, sex, sexual orientation, handicap, age, lifestyle choice, previous (criminal) record or economic status."

Because past criminal convictions are not a negative criterion for membership, and because of dangers presented by continuing construction, children are not allowed to reside in the community.

Membership size varies and is limited by the physical size of the available space at the city yard site. As of January 28, 2016, approximately 60 residents made their home at Dignity Village.

== Housing ==
Designated by the Portland City Council as a transitional housing campground, Dignity Village falls under specific State of Oregon building codes governing campgrounds. This provides a legal zoning status. Lack of building codes has shut down many other shanty town/tent cities in the past. Housing in the Dignity Village community previously consisted of tents, hogans, teepees, light wooden shacks, or more substantial structures built using principles of ecofriendly green construction such as strawbale walls and recycled wood. Light clay straw housing was also built in 2003 as part of the City Repair Project's Village Building Convergence.

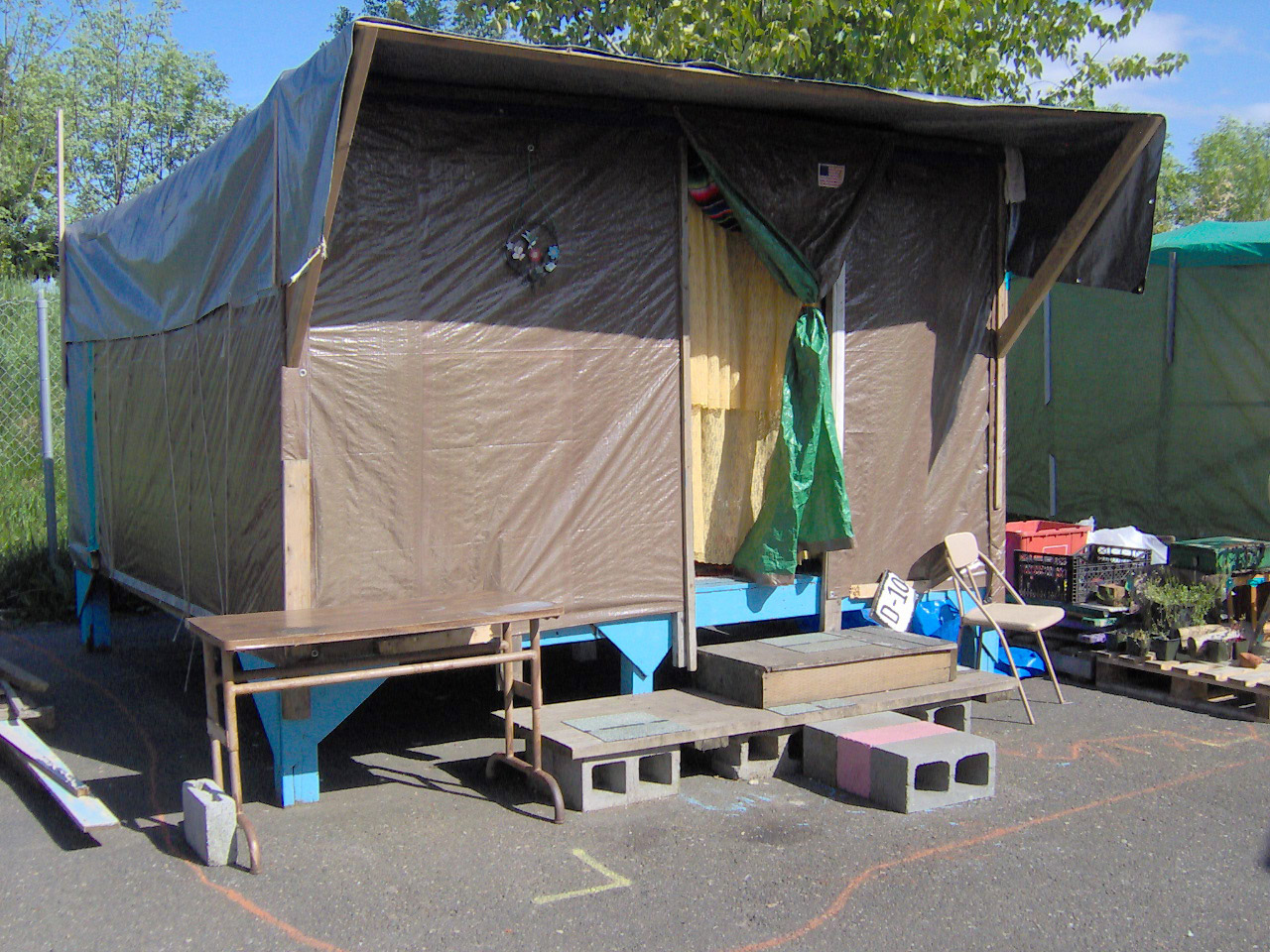
Deck Shelter at Dignity Village - April 2007.

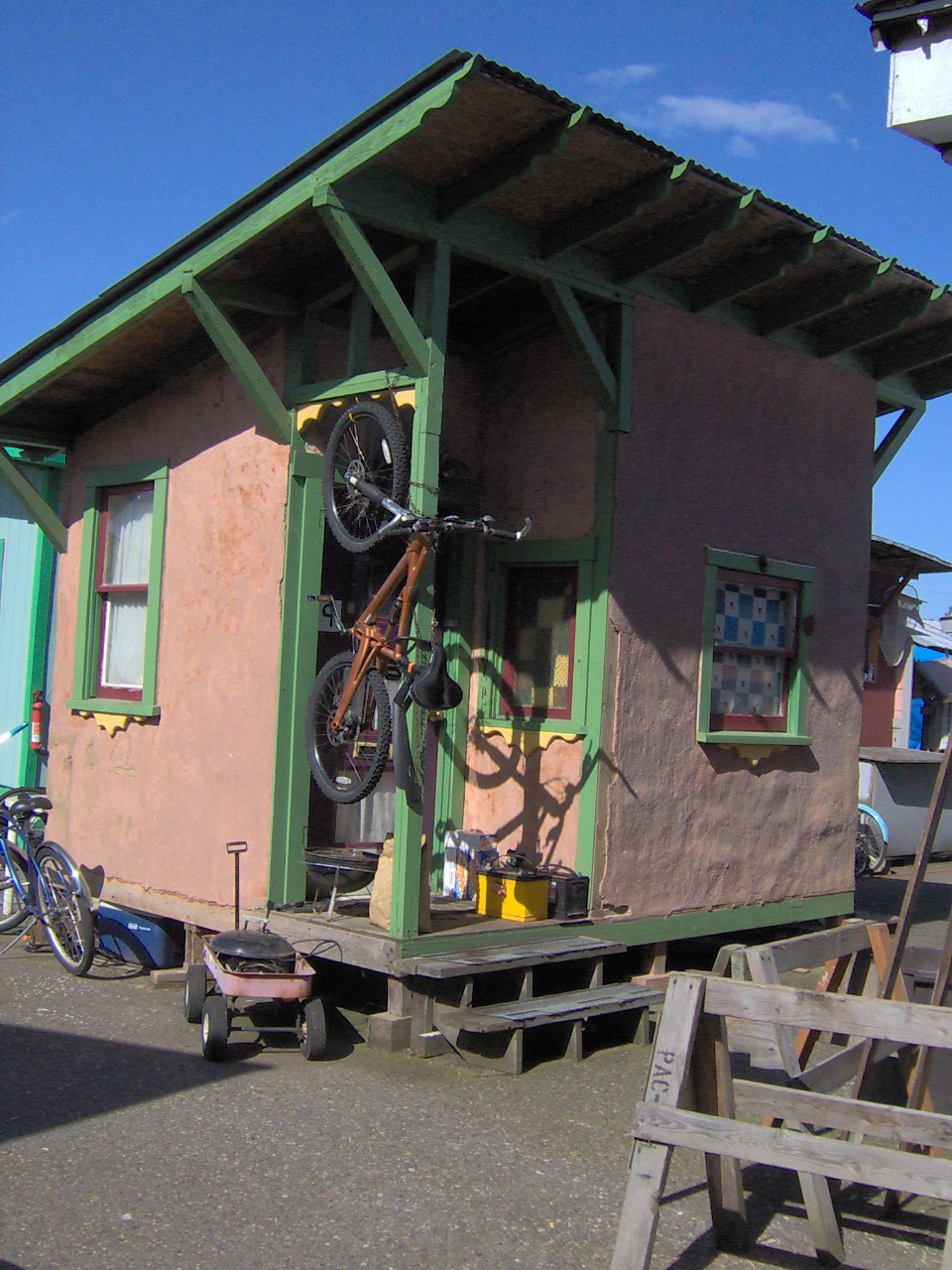
Adobe structure in Dignity Village - April 2007. single-occupancy 10x12-foot structure.

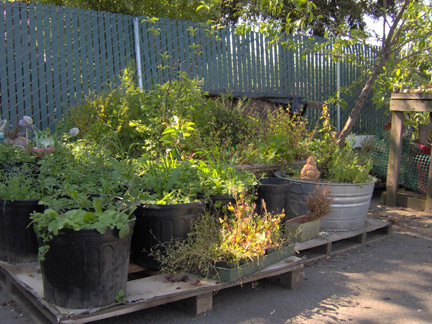
Garden in Dignity Village - April 2007.

== See also ==
- List of tent cities in the United States
