= Building insulation material =

Insulation material

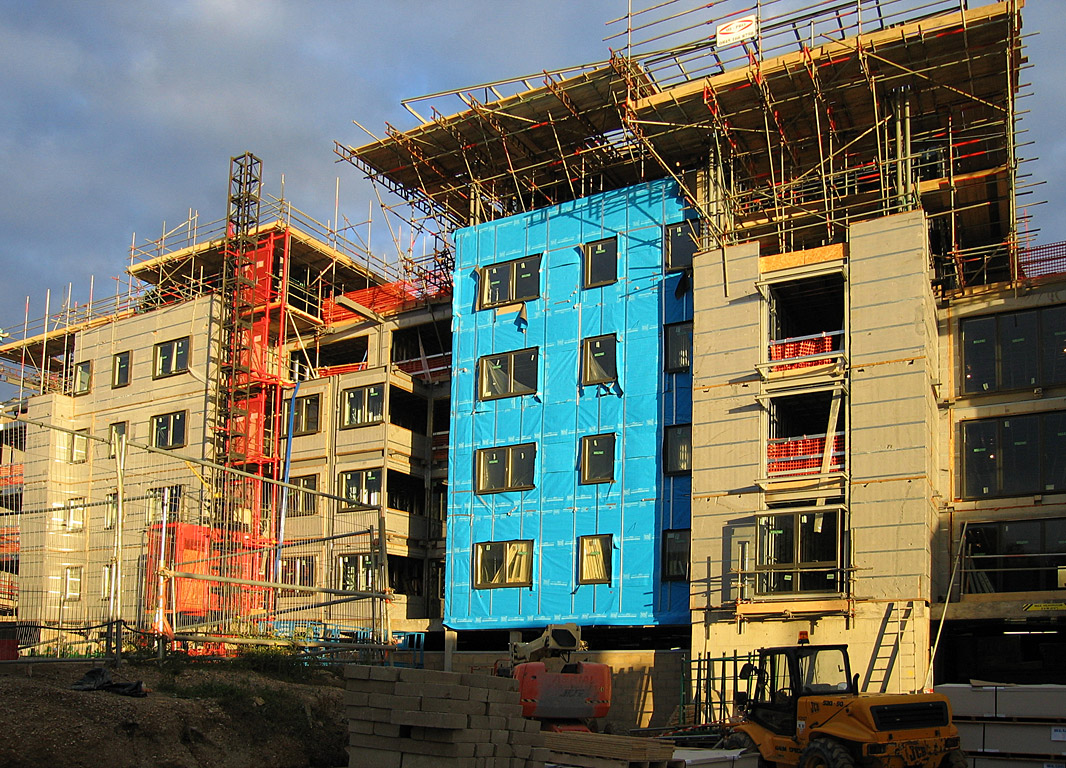
A building site for a row of riverside apartment blocks in Cambridge. The buildings are being constructed using a systems build with a steel frame and various prefabricated components. The blue plastic on the central building is the vapour barrier for the thermal wall insulation before the exterior cladding has been fixed.

Building insulation materials are the building materials that form the thermal envelope of a building or otherwise reduce heat transfer.

Insulation may be categorized by its composition (natural or synthetic materials), form (batts, blankets, loose-fill, spray foam, and panels), structural contribution (insulating concrete forms, structured panels, and straw bales), functional mode (conductive, radiative, convective), resistance to heat transfer, environmental impacts, and more. Sometimes a thermally reflective surface called a radiant barrier is added to a material to reduce the transfer of heat through radiation as well as conduction. The choice of which material or combination of materials is used depends on a wide variety of factors. Some insulation materials have health risks, some so significant the materials are no longer allowed to be used but remain in use in some older buildings such as asbestos fibers and urea.

== Consideration of materials used ==
Factors affecting the type and amount of insulation to use in a building include:

- Thermal conductivity
- Moisture sensitivity
- Compressive strength
- Ease of installation
- Durability – resistance to degradation from compression, moisture, decomposition, etc.
- Ease of replacement at end of life
- Cost effectiveness
- Toxicity
- Flammability
- Environmental impact and sustainability

Considerations regarding building and climate:

- The average climate conditions in the geographical area the building is located
- The temperature the building is used at

Often a combination of materials is used to achieve an optimum solution and there are products which combine different types of insulation into a single form.

== Spray foam ==
Spray foam is a type of insulation that is sprayed in place through a gun. Polyurethane and isocyanate foams are applied as a two-component mixture that comes together at the tip of a gun, and forms an expanding foam. Cementitious foam is applied in a similar manner but does not expand. Spray foam insulation is sprayed onto concrete slabs, into wall cavities of an unfinished wall, against the interior side of sheathing, or through holes drilled in sheathing or drywall into the wall cavity of a finished wall.

=== Advantages ===
- Blocks airflow by expanding & sealing off leaks, gaps and penetrations. (This can also keep out bugs or other vermin)
- Can serve as a semi-permeable vapor barrier with a better permeability rating than plastic sheeting vapor barriers and consequently reduce the buildup of moisture, which can cause mold growth.
- Can fill wall cavities in finished walls without tearing the walls apart (as required with batts).
- Works well in tight spaces (like loose-fill, but superior).
- Provides acoustical insulation (like loose-fill, but superior).
- Expands while curing, filling bypasses, and providing excellent resistance to air infiltration (unlike batts and blankets, which can leave bypasses and air pockets, and superior to some types of loose-fill. Wet-spray cellulose is comparable.).
- Increases structural stability (unlike loose-fill, similar to wet-spray cellulose).
- Can be used in places where loose-fill cannot, such as between joists and rafters. When used between rafters, the spray foam can cover up the nails protruding from the underside of the sheathing, protecting your head.
- Can be applied in small quantities.
- Cementitious foam is fireproof.

=== Disadvantages ===
- The cost can be high compared to traditional insulation.
- Most foams, with the exception of cementitious foams, release toxic fumes when they burn.
- According to the US Environmental Protection Agency, there is insufficient data to accurately assess the potential for exposures to the toxic and environmentally harmful isocyanates which constitute 50% of the foam material.
- Depending on usage and building codes and environment, most foams require protection with a thermal barrier such as drywall on the interior of a house. For example, a 15-minute fire rating may be required.
- Can shrink slightly while curing if not applied on a substrate heated to the manufacturer's recommended temperature.
- Although CFCs are no longer used, some use HCFCs or HFCs as blowing agents. Both are potent greenhouse gases, and HCFCs have some ozone depletion potential.
- Many foam insulations are made from petrochemicals and may be a concern for those seeking to reduce the use of fossil fuels and oil. However, some foams are becoming available that are made from renewable or recycled sources.
- R-value will diminish slightly with age, though the degradation of R-value stops once an equilibrium with the environment is reached. Even after this process, the stabilized R-value is very high.
- Most foams require protection from sunlight and solvents.
- It is difficult to retrofit some foams to an existing building structure because of the chemicals and processes involved.
- If one does not wear a protective mask or goggles, it is possible to temporarily impair one's vision. (2–5 days).
- May require the HVAC system to have a source of fresh outside air, since the structure may not refresh inside air without it.

=== Advantages of closed-cell over open-cell foams ===
- Open-cell foam is porous, allowing water vapor and liquid water to penetrate the insulation. Closed-cell foam is non-porous, and not moisture-penetrable, thereby effectively forming a semi-permeable vapor barrier. (N.B., vapor barriers are usually required by the Building Codes, regardless of the type of insulation used. Check with the local authorities to find out the requirements for your area.)
- Closed-cell foams are superior insulators. While open-cell foams typically have R-values of 3 to 4 per inch (RSI-0.53 to RSI-0.70 per inch), closed-cell foams can attain R-values of 5 to 8 per inch (RSI-0.88 to RSI-1.41 per inch). This is important if space is limited, because it allows a thinner layer of insulation to be used. For example, a 1-inch layer of closed-cell foam provides about the same insulation factor as 2 inches of open-cell foam.
- Closed-cell foam is very strong, and structurally reinforces the insulated surface. By contrast, open-cell foam is soft when cured, with little structural strength.
- Open-cell foam requires trimming after installation, and disposal of the waste material. Unlike open-cell foam, closed-cell foam rarely requires any trimming, with little or no waste.

=== Advantages of open-cell over closed-cell foams ===
- Open cell foams will allow timber to breathe.
- Open cell foams are incredibly effective as a sound barrier, having about twice the sound resistance in normal frequency ranges as closed-cell foam.
- Open cell foams provide a better economical yield.
- Open cell foams often have a low exothermic reaction temperature; will not harm coatings on electrical wiring, plumbing or other building components.

=== Types ===
Cementitious foam
One example is AirKrete, at R-3.9 (RSI-0.69) per inch and no restriction on depth of application. Non-hazardous. Being fireproof, it will not smoke at all upon direct contact with flame, and is a two-hour firewall at a 3.5 in (89 mm) (or normal 2 in × 4 in (51 mm × 102 mm) stud wall) application, per ASTM E-814 testing (UL 1479). Great for sound deadening; does not echo like other foams. Environmentally friendly. Non-expansive (good for existing homes where interior sheathing is in place). Fully sustainable: Consists of magnesium oxide cement and air, which is made from magnesium oxide extracted from seawater. Blown with air (no CFCs, HCFCs or other harmful blowing agents). Nontoxic, even during application. Does not shrink or settle. Zero VOC emission. Chemically inert (no known symptoms of exposure per MSDS). Insect resistant. Mold Proof. Insoluble in water. Disadvantages: Fragile at the low densities needed to achieve the quoted R value and, like all foams, it is more expensive than conventional fiber insulations. In 2010, the Ontario Building Code Commission ruled that AirKrete did not conform to requirements for a specific application in the building code. Their ruling states "As the proposed insulation is not impermeable, it could allow water or moisture to enter the wall assembly, which could then cause damage or deterioration of the building elements." As of 2014-08-21, the domain airkretecanada.com appears to be abandoned.
Polyisocyanurate
Typically R-5.6 (RSI-0.99) or slightly better after stabilization – higher values (at least R-7, or RSI-1.23) in stabilized boards. Less flammable than polyurethane.
Phenolic injection foam
Such as Tripolymer R-5.1 per inch (ASTM-C-177). Known for its air sealing abilities. Tripolymer can be installed in wall cavities that have fiberglass and cellulose in them. Non-hazardous. Not restricted by depth of application. Fire resistant – flame spread 5, smoke spread 0 (ASTM-E-84) – will not smoke at all upon direct contact with flame and is a two-hour firewall at a 3.5 in (89 mm), or normal 2 in × 4 in (51 mm × 102 mm) stud wall, application per ASTM E-199. Great for sound deadening, STC 53 (ASTM E413-73); does not echo like other foams. Environmentally friendly. Non-expansive (good for existing homes where interior sheathing is in place). Fully sustainable: Consists of phenolic, a foaming agent, and air. Blown with air (no CFCs, HCFCs or other harmful blowing agents). Nontoxic, even during application. Does not shrink or settle. Zero VOC emission. Chemically inert (no known symptoms of exposure per MSDS). Insect resistant. Mold Proof. Insoluble in water. Disadvantages: Like all foams, it is more expensive than conventional fiber insulations when only comparing sq ft pricing. When you compare price to R value per sq ft the price is about the same.
Polystyrene (expanded polystyrene (EPS) and extruded polystyrene (XPS))
Closed-cell polyurethane
White or yellow. May use a variety of blowing agents. Resistant to water wicking and water vapor.: An example of a commercial closed-cell polyurethane product:

==== Ecomate ====
R-8 per inch. Ecomate is a trademarked foam blowing agent technology and family of polyurethanes which has a neutral impact on the environment. The worldwide patent was awarded to Foam Supplies Incorporated (FSI) in 2002. This is a new generation eco-friendly foam blowing agent that is free of chlorofluorocarbons (CFCs), hydrochlorofluorocarbons (HCFCs), and hydrofluorocarbons (HFCs) based on naturally occurring methyl methanoate.

Open-cell (low density) polyurethane
White or yellow. Expands to fill and seal cavity, but expands slowly, preventing damage to the wall. Resistant to water wicking, but permeable to water vapor. Fire resistant. Some types of polyurethane insulation are pour-able.

Here are two commercial open-cell, low-density polyurethane products:

Icynene
Icynene is a trademarked brand of isocyanate open-cell spray foam from Huntsman Building Solutions. The classic version has a thermal resistance (R value) of 3.7 per inch and other versions have even higher values. The formula also includes a flame retardant. Icynene uses water for its spray application and the chemical expansion is caused by the carbon dioxide generated between the water and isocyanate material. Icynene will expand up to 100 times it original size within the first 6 seconds of being applied. Icynene contains no ozone-depleting substances such as CFCs, HFC's, HCFC's. Icynene contains volatile organic compounds (VOCs). Icynene will not emit any harmful gases once cured. Icynene has a Global warming potential of 1. Flammability is relatively low. Icynene maintains its efficiency with no loss of R-Value for the life of the install. Icynene is more expensive compared to traditional insulation methods. Any potential for harm is primarily during the installation phase and particularly for installers. The manufacture of icynene involves many toxic petrochemicals.

Sealection 500 spray foam
R-3.8 (RSI-0.67) per inch. a water-blown low density spray polyurethane foam that uses water in a chemical reaction to create carbon dioxide and steam which expands the foam. Flame spread is 21 and smoke developed is 217 which makes it a Class I material (best fire rating). Disadvantages: Is an Isocyanate.

== Insulating concrete forms ==
Insulating concrete forms (ICFs) are stay-in-place formwork made from insulating materials to build energy-efficient, cast-in-place, reinforced concrete walls.

== Rigid panels ==
Rigid panel insulation, also known as continuous insulation can be made from foam plastics such as polyisocyanurate or polystyrene, or from fibrous materials such as fiberglass, rock and slag wool. Rigid panel continuous insulation is often used to provide a thermal break in the building envelope, thus reducing thermal bridging.

== Structural insulated panels ==
Structural insulated panels (SIPs), also called stressed-skin walls, use the same concept as in foam-core external doors, but extend the concept to the entire house. They can be used for ceilings, floors, walls, and roofs. The panels usually consist of plywood, oriented strandboard, or drywall glued and sandwiched around a core consisting of expanded polystyrene, polyurethane, polyisocyanurate, compressed wheat straw, or epoxy. Epoxy is too expensive to use as an insulator on its own, but it has a high R-value (7 to 9), high strength, and good chemical and moisture resistance.

SIPs come in various thicknesses. When building a house, they are glued together and secured with lumber. They provide the structural support, rather than the studs used in traditional framing.

=== Advantages ===
- Strong. Able to bear loads, including external loads from precipitation and wind.
- Faster construction than stick-built house. Less lumber required.
- Insulate acoustically.
- Impermeable to moisture.
- Can truck prefabricated panels to construction site and assemble on site.
- Create shell of solid insulation around house, while reducing bypasses common with stick-frame construction. The result is an inherently energy-efficient house.
- Do not use formaldehyde, CFCs, or HCFCs in manufacturing.
- True R-values and lower energy costs.

=== Disadvantages ===
- More expensive than other types of insulation.
- Thermal bridging at splines and lumber fastening points unless a thermally broken spline is used (insulated lumber).

== Fiberglass batts and blankets (glass wool) ==
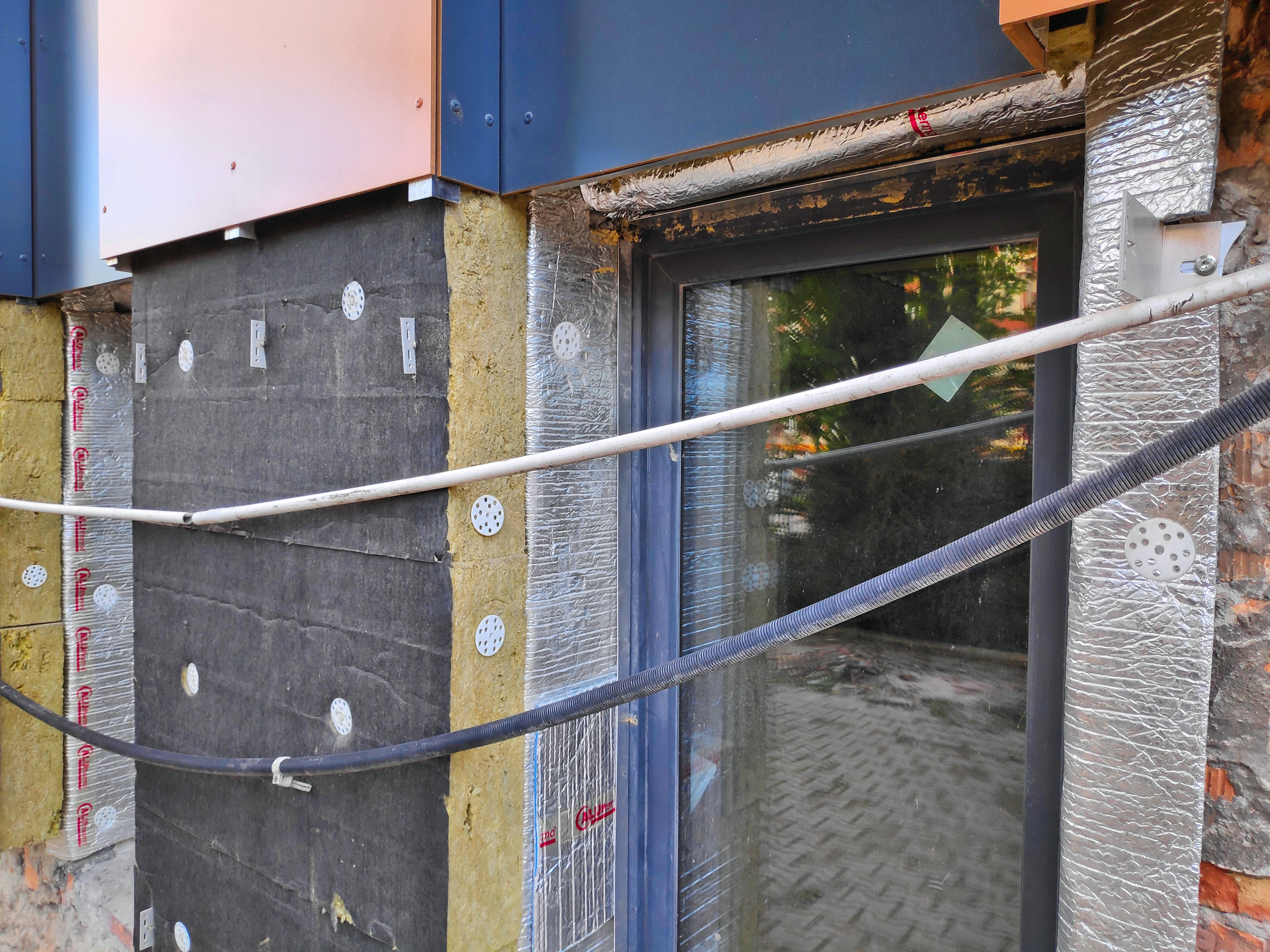
Thermal insulation works using mineral wool and aluminium composite mat

Batts are precut, whereas blankets are available in continuous rolls. Compressing the material reduces its effectiveness. Cutting it to accommodate electrical boxes and other obstructions allows air a free path to cross through the wall cavity. One can install batts in two layers across an unfinished attic floor, perpendicular to each other, for increased effectiveness at preventing heat bridging. Blankets can cover joists and studs as well as the space between them. Batts can be challenging and unpleasant to hang under floors between joists; straps, or staple cloth or wire mesh across joists, can hold it up.

Gaps between batts (bypasses) can become sites of air infiltration or condensation (both of which reduce the effectiveness of the insulation) and requires strict attention during the installation. By the same token careful weatherization and installation of vapour barriers is required to ensure that the batts perform optimally. Air infiltration can be also reduced by adding a layer of cellulose loose-fill on top of the material.

=== Types ===
- Rock and slag wool. Usually made from rock (basalt, diabase) or iron ore blast furnace slag. Some rock wool contains recycled glass. Nonflammable.
- Fiberglass. Made from molten glass, usually with 20% to 30% recycled industrial waste and post-consumer content. Nonflammable, except for the facing (if present). Sometimes, the manufacturer modifies the facing so that it is fire-resistant. Some fiberglass is unfaced, some is paper-faced with a thin layer of asphalt, and some is foil-faced. Paper-faced batts are vapor retarders, not vapor barriers. Foil-faced batts are vapor barriers. The vapor barrier must be installed toward the warm side.
- High-density fiberglass
- Plastic fiber, usually made from recycled plastic. Does not cause irritation like fiberglass, but more difficult to cut than fiberglass. Not used in US. Flammable, but treated with fire-retardant.

== Natural fiber ==
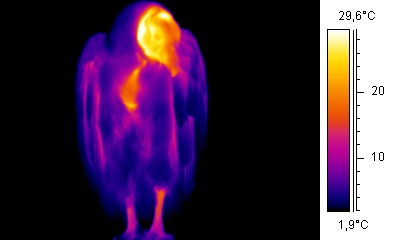
Thermographic image of a vulture in the winter. The vulture's feathers trap air, insulating the vulture from the cold.

Natural fiber insulations, treated as necessary with low toxicity fire and insect retardants, are available in Europe : Natural fiber insulations can be used loose as granulats or formed into flexible or semi-rigid panels and rigid panels using a binder (mostly synthetic such as polyester, polyurethane or polyolefin). The binder material can be new or recycled.

Examples include cork, cotton, recycled tissue/clothes, hemp, flax, coco, wool, lightweight wood fiber, cellulose, seaweed, etc. Similarly, many plant-based waste materials can be used as insulation such as nut shells, corncobs, most straws including lavender straw, recycled wine bottle corks (granulated), etc. They usually have significantly less thermal performance than industrial products; this can be compensated by increasing thickness of the insulation layer. They may or may not require fire retardants or anti-insect/pest treatments. Clay coating is a nontoxic additive which often meets these requirements.

Traditional clay-impregnated light straw insulation has been used for centuries in the northern climates of Europe. The clay coating gives the insulation a half hour fire rating according to DIN (German) standards.

An additional source of insulation derived from hemp is hempcrete, which consists of hemp hurds (shives) mixed with a lime binder. It has little structural strength but can provide racking strength and insulation with comparable or superior R-values depending on the ratio of hemp to binder.

=== Cork insulation Board ===
During the 2nd century C.100 -C.200 it was the first time human civilisation was introduced to material of cork, and it was only until the 19th century when cork was widely used leading to major industrial production. Cork, which is harvested from the Oak trees generally found in Portugal, Spain and other Mediterranean countries. When a tree reaches 20 to 35 years old, it can be harvested in 10-year intervals for more than 200 years. Oak bark has a lattice-like molecular structure filled with millions of air bubbles giving the bark resilience, elasticity, thermal insulating, acoustic dampening, and shock absorbing properties. The material is sustainable, reusable and recyclable.

There are two types of cork, the pure cork, which is preferable due to its natural bonding properties, and the agglomeration cork. The pure cork is made by processes of heating and steaming whereby cork granulates are molded into a block. The natural resin of the cork acts as a bonding agent. An artificial bonding agent is required for the production of agglomeration cork.

Cork is typically used for acoustic and thermal insulation within walls, floors, ceilings and facades. A natural fire retardant, thermal insulating cork board is also non-allergenic, simple-to-install and a considerably safer substitute to fiber and plastic based insulation. Notable challenges with cork include difficulty in maintenance and cleaning especially if the material is exposed to heavy use such as insulation for flooring. Minor damages to cork surface can make the material more prone to staining.

=== Sheep's wool insulation ===
Sheep's wool insulation is a very efficient thermal insulator with a similar performance to fiberglass, approximately R13-R16 for a 4-inch-thick layer. Sheep's wool has no reduction in performance even when condensation is present, but its fire retarding treatment can deteriorate through repeated moisture. It is made from the waste wool that the carpet and textile industries reject, and is available in both rolls and batts for both thermal and acoustic insulation of housing and commercial buildings. Wool is capable of absorbing as much as 40% of its own weight in condensation while remaining dry to the touch. As wool absorbs moisture it heats up and therefore reduces the risk of condensation. It has the unique ability to absorb VOC gases such as formaldehyde, nitrogen dioxide, sulphur dioxide and lock them up permanently. Sheep's wool insulation has a long lifetime due to the natural crimp in the fibre, endurance testing has shown it has a life expectancy of over 100 years.

=== Wood fiber ===
Wood fiber insulation is available as loose fill, flexible batts and rigid panels for all thermal and sound insulation uses. It can be used as internal insulation : between studs, joists or ceiling rafters, under timber floors to reduce sound transmittance, against masonry walls or externally : using a rain screen cladding or roofing, or directly plastered/rendered, over timber rafters or studs or masonry structures as external insulation to reduce thermal bridges. There are two manufacturing processes:

- a wet process similar to pulp mills in which the fibers are softened and under heat and pressure the ligin in the fibres is used to create boards. The boards are limited to approximately 25 mm thickness; thicker boards are made by gluing (with modified starch or PVA wood glue). Additives such as latex or bitumen are added to increase water resistance.
- a dry process where a synthetic binder such as pet (polyester melted bond), polyolefin or polyurethane is added and the boards/batts pressed to different densities to make flexible batts or rigid boards.

=== Cotton batts ===
Cotton insulation is increasing in popularity as an environmentally preferable option for insulation. It has an R-value of around 3.7 (RSI-0.65), equivalent to the median value for fiberglass batts. The cotton is primarily recycled industrial scrap, providing a sustainability benefit. The batts do not use the toxic formaldehyde backing found in fiberglass, and the manufacture is nowhere near as energy intensive as the mining and production process required for fiberglass. Boric acid is used as a flame retardant. A small quantity of polyolefin is melted as an adhesive to bind the product together (and is preferable to formaldehyde adhesives). Installation is similar to fiberglass, without the need for a respirator but requiring some additional time to cut the material. Cotton insulation costs about 10-20% more than fiberglass insulation. As with any batt insulation, proper installation is important to ensure high energy efficiency.

=== Advantages ===
- Equivalent R-Value to typical fiberglass batts
- Recycled content, no formaldehyde or other toxic substances, and very low toxicity during manufacture (only from the polyolefin)
- May help qualify for LEED or similar environmental building certification programs
- Fibers do not cause itchiness, no cancer risk from airborne fibers

=== Disadvantages ===
- Difficult to cut. Some installers may charge a slightly higher cost for installation as compared to other batts. This does not affect the effectiveness of the insulation, but may require choosing an installer more carefully, as any batt should be cut to fit the cavity well.
- Even with proper installation, batts do not completely seal the cavity against air movement (as with cellulose or expanding foam).
- Still requires a vapor retarder or barrier (unlike cellulose)
- May be hard to dry if a leak allows excessive moisture into the insulated cavity

== Loose-fill (including cellulose) ==
Loose-fill materials can be blown into attics, finished wall cavities, and hard-to-reach areas. They are ideal for these tasks because they conform to spaces and fill in the nooks and crannies. They can also be sprayed in place, usually with water-based adhesives. Many types are made of recycled materials (a type of cellulose) and are relatively inexpensive.

General procedure for retrofits in walls:

- Drill holes in wall with hole saw, taking firestops, plumbing pipes, and other obstructions into account. It may be desirable to drill two holes in each wall cavity/joist section, one at the bottom and a second at the top for both verification and top-off.
- Pump loose fill into wall cavity, gradually pulling the hose up as the cavity fills.
- Cap the holes in the wall.

=== Advantages ===
- Cellulose insulation is environmentally preferable (80% recycled newspaper) and safe. It has a high recycled content and less risk to the installer than fiberglass (loose fill or batts).
- R-Value 3.4 – 3.8 (RSI-0.60 – 0.67) per inch (imperial units)
- Loose fill insulation fills the wall cavity better than batts. Wet-spray applications typically seal even better than dry-spray.
- Class I fire safety rating
- No formaldehyde-based binders
- Not made from petrochemicals nor chemicals with a high toxicity

=== Disadvantages ===
- Weight may cause ceilings to sag if the material is very heavy. Professional installers know how to avoid this, and typical sheet rock is fine when dense-packed.
- Will settle over time, losing some of its effectiveness. Unscrupulous contractors may "fluff" insulation using fewer bags than optimal for a desired R-value. Dry-spray (but not wet-spray) cellulose can settle 20% of its original volume. However, the expected settling is included in the stated R-Value. The dense-pack dry installation reduces settling and increases R-value.
- R-values stated on packaging are based on laboratory conditions; air infiltration can significantly reduce effectiveness, particularly for fiberglass loose fill. Cellulose inhibits convection more effectively. In general, loose fill is seen as being better at reducing the presence of gaps in insulation than batts, as the cavity is sealed more carefully. Air infiltration through the insulating material itself is not studied well, but would be lower for wet-spray insulations such as wet-spray cellulose.
- May absorb moisture.

=== Types ===
- Rock and slag wool, also known as mineral wool or mineral fiber. Made from rock (basalt, diabase), iron ore blast furnace slag, or recycled glass. Nonflammable. More resistant to airflow than fiberglass. Clumps and loses effectiveness when moist or wet, but does not absorb much moisture, and regains effectiveness once dried. Older mineral wool can contain asbestos, but normally this is in trace amounts.
- Cellulose insulation. Cellulose, is denser and more resistant to air flow than fiberglass. Persistent moisture will weaken aluminium sulphate flame-retardants in cellulose (which are sometimes used in the US). However, borate fire retardants (used primarily in Australia and commonly in the US) have been in use for more than 30 years and are not affected by moisture in any way. Dense-pack cellulose is highly resistant to air infiltration and is either installed into an open wall cavity using nets or temporary frames, or is retrofitted into finished walls. However, dense-pack cellulose blocks, but does not permanently seal, bypasses, in the way a closed-cell spray foam would. Furthermore, as with batts and blankets, warm, moist air will still pass through, unless there is a continuous near-perfect vapor barrier.
- Wet-spray cellulose insulation is similar to loose-fill insulation, but is applied with a small quantity of water to help the cellulose bind to the inside of open wall cavities, and to make the cellulose more resistant to settling. Spray application provides even better protection against air infiltration and improves wall rigidity. It also allows application on sloped walls, attics, and similar spaces. Wet-spray is best for new construction, as the wall must be allowed to dry completely before sealing with drywall (a moisture meter is recommended). Moist-spray (also called stabilized) cellulose uses less water to speed up drying time.
- Fiberglass. Usually pink, yellow, or white. Loses effectiveness when moist or wet, but does not absorb much water. Nonflammable. See Health effects of fiberglass.
- Natural insulations such as granulated cork, hemp fibres, grains, all which can be treated with a low toxicity fire and insect retardants
- Vermiculite. Generally gray or brown.
- Perlite. Generally white or yellow.
- Cotton, wool, hemp, corn cobs, strawdust and other harvested natural materials. Not common.
- Granulated cork. Cork is as good an insulator as foam. It does not absorb water as it consists of closed cells. Resists fire. Used in Europe.
- Most plant based insulations such as wood chips, wood fiber, sawdust, redwood bark, hemlock fiber, balsa wood, hemp fiber, flax fiber, etc. are hygroscopic. Wood absorbs water, which reduces its effectiveness as a thermal insulator. In the presence of moisture, wood is susceptible to mold, mildew, and rot. Careful design of wall, roof and floor systems as done in Europe avoid these problems which are due to poor design.

=== Regulations ===
US regulatory standards for cellulose insulation

- 16 CFR Part 1209 (Consumer Products Safety Commission, or CPSC) – covers settled density, corrosiveness, critical radiant flux, and smoldering combustion.
- ASTM Standard C-739 – loose-fill cellulose insulation – covers all factors of the CPSC regulation and five additional characteristics, R-value, starch content, moisture absorption, odor, and resistance to fungus growth.
- ASTM Standard C-1149 – Industry standard for self-supported spray-applied cellulose insulation for exposed or wall cavity application – covers density, R-value, surface burning, adhesive strength, smoldering combustion, fungi resistance, corrosion, moisture vapor absorption, odor, flame resistance permanency (no test exists for this characteristic), substrate deflection (for exposed application products), and air erosion (for exposed application products).
- 16 CFR Part 460 – (Federal Trade Commission regulation) commonly known as the "R-Value Rule," intended to eliminate misleading insulation marketing claims and ensure publication of accurate R-Value and coverage data.

== Aerogels ==
Skylights, solariums and other special applications may use aerogels, a high-performance, low-density material. Silica aerogel has the lowest thermal conductivity of any known substance (short of a vacuum), and carbon aerogel absorbs infrared radiation (i.e., heat from sun rays) while still allowing daylight to enter. The combination of silica and carbon aerogel gives the best insulating properties of any known material, approximately twice the insulative protection of the next best insulative material, closed-cell foam.

== Straw bales ==
The use of highly compressed straw bales as insulation, though uncommon, is gaining popularity in experimental building projects for the high R-value and low cost of a thick wall made of straw. "Research by Joe McCabe at the Univ. of Arizona found R-value for both wheat and rice bales was about R-2.4 (RSI-0.42) per inch with the grain, and R-3 (RSI-0.53) per inch across the grain. A 23" wide 3 string bale laid flat = R-54.7 (RSI-9.64), laid on edge (16" wide) = R-42.8 (RSI-7.54). For 2 string bales laid flat (18" wide) = R-42.8 (RSI-7.54), and on edge (14" wide) = R-32.1 (RSI-5.66)" (Steen et al.: The Straw Bale House, 1994). Using a straw bale in-fill sandwich roof greatly increases the R value. This compares very favorably with the R-19 (RSI-3.35) of a conventional 2 x 6 insulated wall. When using straw bales for construction, the bales must be tightly-packed and allowed to dry out sufficiently. Any air gaps or moisture can drastically reduce the insulating effectiveness.

== Reflective insulation and radiant barriers ==
Reflective insulation and radiant barriers reduce the radiation of heat to or from the surface of a material. Radiant barriers will reflect radiant energy. A radiant barrier by itself will not affect heat conducted through the material by direct contact or heat transferred by moist air rising or convection. For this reason, trying to associate R-values with radiant barriers is difficult and inappropriate. The R-value test measures heat transfer through the material, not to or from its surface. There is no standard test designed to measure the reflection of radiated heat energy alone. Radiated heat is a significant means of heat transfer; the sun's heat arrives by radiating through space and not by conduction or convection. At night the absence of heat (i.e. cold) is the exact same phenomenon, with the heat radiating described mathematically as the linear opposite. Radiant barriers prevent radiant heat transfer equally in both directions. However, heat flow to and from surfaces also occurs via convection, which in some geometries is different in different directions.

Reflective aluminum foil is the most common material used as a radiant barrier. It has no significant mass to absorb and retain heat. It also has very low emittance values "E-values" (typically 0.03 compared to 0.90 for most bulk insulation) which significantly reduces heat transfer by radiation.

=== Types of radiant barriers ===
- Foil or "reflective foil laminate"s (RFL).
- Foil-faced polyurethane or foil-faced polyisocyanurate panels.
- Foil-faced polystyrene. This laminated, high density EPS is more flexible than rigid panels, works as a vapor barrier, and works as a thermal break. Uses include the underside of roof sheathing, ceilings, and on walls. For best results, this should not be used as a cavity fill type insulation.
- Foil-backed bubble pack. This is thin, more flexible than rigid panels, works as a vapor barrier, and resembles plastic bubble wrap with aluminum foil on both sides. Often used on cold pipes, cold ducts, and the underside of roof sheathing.
- Light-colored roof shingles and reflective paint. Often called cool roofs, these help to keep attics cooler in the summer and in hot climates. To maximize radiative cooling at night, they are often chosen to have high thermal emissivity, whereas their low emissivity for the solar spectrum reflects heat during the day.
- Metal roofs; e.g., aluminum or copper.

Radiant barriers can function as a vapor barriers and serve both purposes with one product.

Materials with one shiny side (such as foil-faced polystyrene) must be positioned with the shiny side facing an air space to be effective. An aluminum foil radiant barrier can be placed either way – the shiny side is created by the rolling mill during the manufacturing process and does not affect the reflective of the foil material. As radiant barriers work by reflecting infra-red energy, the aluminum foil would work just the same if both sides were dull.

=== Reflective Insulation ===
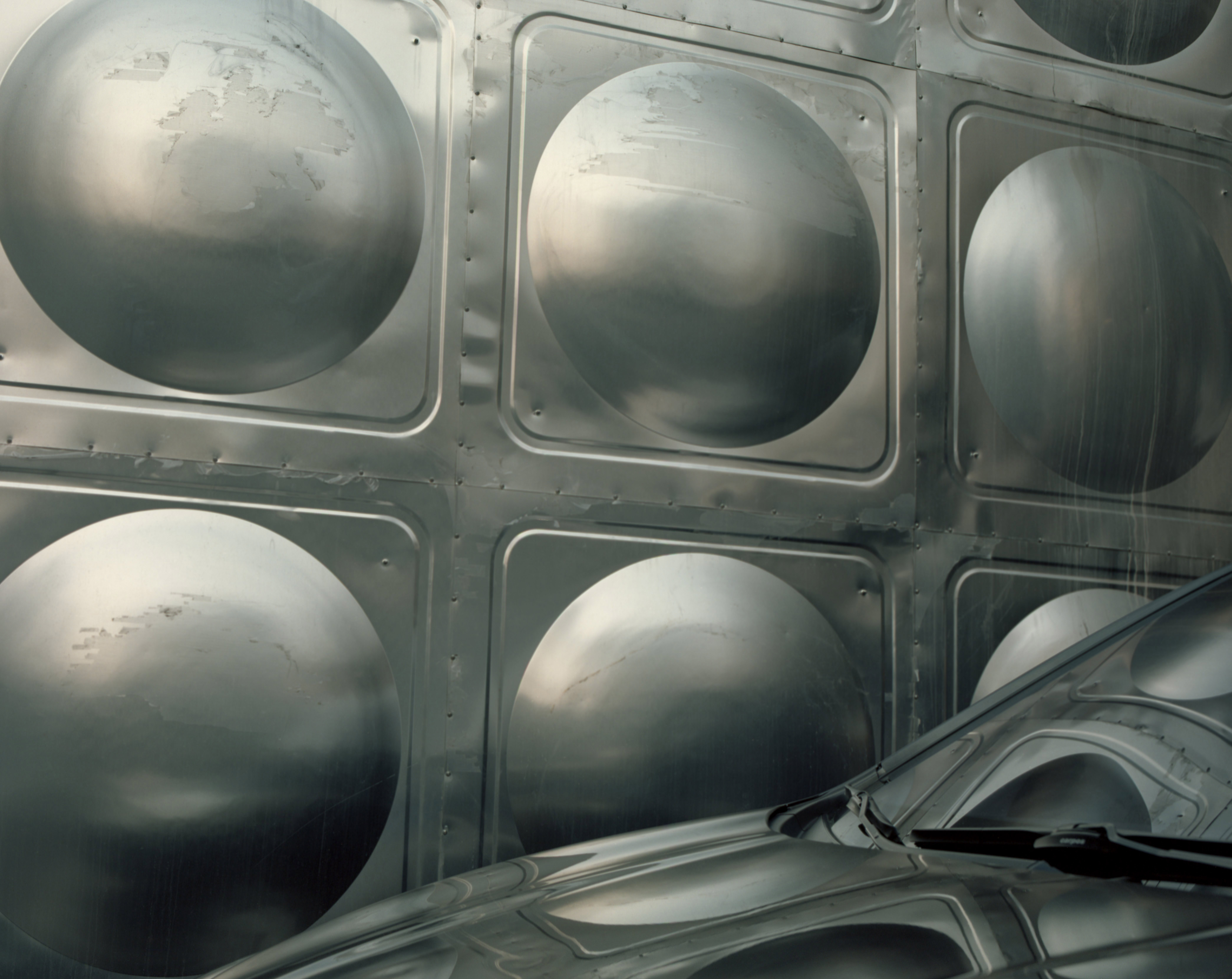
Aluminum panel facing an air space.

Insulation is a barrier material to resist/reduce substance (water, vapor, etc. ) /energy (sound, heat, electric, etc.) to transfer from one side to another.

Heat/ Thermal Insulation is a barrier material to resist / block / reflect the heat energy (either one or more of the Conduction, Convection or Radiation) to transfer from one side to another.

Reflective Insulation is one of the Heat/Thermal Insulation to reflect Radiation Heat (Radiant Heat) transfer from one side to another due to the reflective surface (or low emittance).

There are a lot of definitions about "Thermal/Heat Insulation" and the common misinterpretation of "Thermal/Heat Insulation" = "Bulk/Mass/Batt Insulation" which is actually uses to resist Conduction Heat Transfer with certain "R-Value".

As such Materials reflecting Radiant Heat with negligible "R-Value" should also be classified as "Thermal/ Heat Insulation".

Thus Reflective Insulation = Radiant Barrier

=== Advantages ===
- Very effective in warmer climates
- No change in thermal performance over time due to compaction, disintegration or moisture absorption
- Thin sheets takes up less room than bulk insulation
- Can act as a vapor barriers
- Non-toxic/non-carcinogenic
- Will not mold or mildew
- Radon retarder, will limit radon penetration through the floor

=== Disadvantages ===
- Must be combined with other types of insulation in very cold climates
- May result in an electrical safety hazard where the foil comes into contact with faulty electrical wiring

== Hazardous and discontinued insulation ==
Certain forms of insulation used in the past are now no longer used because of recognized health risks.

=== Urea-formaldehyde foam (UFFI) and panels ===
Urea-formaldehyde insulation releases poisonous formaldehyde gas, causing indoor air quality problems. The chemical bond between the urea and formaldehyde is weak, resulting in degradation of the foam cells and emission of toxic formaldehyde gas into the home over time. Furthermore, some manufacturers used excess formaldehyde to ensure chemical bonding of all of the urea. Any leftover formaldehyde would escape after the mixing. Most states outlawed it in the early 1980s after dangers to building occupants were discovered. However emissions are highest when the urea-formaldehyde is new and decrease over time, so houses that have had urea-formaldehyde within their walls for years or decades do not require remediation.

UFFI provides little mechanical strength, as the material is weak and brittle. Before its risks were recognized, it was used because it was a cheap, effective insulator with a high R-value and its open-cell structure was a good acoustic insulator. Though it absorbed moisture easily, it regained effectiveness as an insulator when dried.

=== Asbestos ===
Asbestos is a mineral fiber that occurs in rock and soil that has traditionally been used as an insulation material in many homes and buildings. It is fireproof, a good thermal and electrical insulator, and resistant to chemical attack and wear. It has also been found that asbestos can cause cancer when in friable form (that is, when likely to release fibers into the air – when broken, jagged, shredded, or scuffed).

When found in the home, asbestos often resembles grayish-white corrugated cardboard coated with cloth or canvas, usually held in place around pipes and ducts with metal straps. Things that typically might contain asbestos:

- Boiler and furnace insulation.
- Heating duct wrapping.
- Pipe insulation ("lagging").
- Ducting and transite pipes within slabs.
- Acoustic ceilings.
- Textured materials.
- Resilient flooring.
- Blown-in insulation.
- Roofing materials and felts.

== Health and safety issues ==
=== Spray polyurethane foam (SPF) ===
All polyurethane foams are composed of petrochemicals. Foam insulation often uses hazardous chemicals with high human toxicity, such as isocyanates, benzene and toluene. The foaming agents no longer use ozone-depleting substances. Personal Protective Equipment is required for all people in the area being sprayed to eliminate exposure to isocyanates which constitute about 50% of the foam raw material.

=== Fiberglass ===
Fiberglass is the most common residential insulating material, and is usually applied as batts of insulation, pressed between studs. Health and safety issues include potential cancer risk from exposure to glass fibers, formaldehyde off-gassing from the backing/resin, use of petrochemicals in the resin, and the environmental health aspects of the production process. Green building practices shun Fiberglass insulation.

The World Health Organization has declared fiber glass insulation as potentially carcinogenic (WHO, 1998). In October 2001, an international expert review by the International Agency for Research on Cancer (IARC) re-evaluated the 1988 IARC assessment of glass fibers and removed glass wools from its list of possible carcinogens by downgrading the classification of these fibers from Group 2B (possible carcinogen) to Group 3 (not classifiable as to carcinogenicity in humans). All fiber glass wools that are commonly used for thermal and acoustical insulation are included in this classification. IARC noted specifically: "Epidemiologic studies published during the 15 years since the previous IARC Monographs review of these fibers in 1988 provide no evidence of increased risks of lung cancer or mesothelioma (cancer of the lining of the body cavities) from occupational exposures during manufacture of these materials, and inadequate evidence overall of any cancer risk."

The IARC downgrade is consistent with the conclusion reached by the US National Academy of Sciences, which in 2000 found "no significant association between fiber exposure and lung cancer or nonmalignant respiratory disease in the MVF [man-made vitreous fiber] manufacturing environment." However, manufacturers continue to provide cancer risk warning labels on their products, apparently as indemnification against claims.

However, the literature should be considered carefully before determining that the risks should be disregarded. The OSHA chemical sampling page provides a summary of the risks, as does the NIOSH Pocket Guide.

Miraflex is a new type of fiberglass batt that has curly fibers that are less itchy and create less dust. You can also look for fiberglass products factory-wrapped in plastic or fabric.

Fiberglass is energy intensive in manufacture. Fiberglass fibers are bound into batts using adhesive binders, which can contain adhesives that can slowly release formaldehyde over many years. The industry is mitigating this issue by switching to binder materials not containing formaldehyde; some manufacturers offer agriculturally based binder resins made from soybean oil. Formaldehyde-free batts and batts made with varying amounts of recycled glass (some approaching 50% post-consumer recycled content) are available.

=== Loose-fill cellulose ===
Cellulose is 100% natural and 75–85% of it is made from recycled newsprint. Health issues (if any) appear to be minor, and most concerns around the flame retardants and mold potential seem to be misrepresentations.

- Cellulose is classified by OSHA as a dust nuisance during installation, and the use of a dust mask is recommended.
- Cellulose is treated with a flame retardant and insect repellent, usually boric acid and sometimes borax to resist insects and rodents. To humans, boric acid has a toxicity comparable to table salt.
- Mold has been seen as a potential concern. However, according to the Cellulose Manufacturer's Association, "One thing that has not contributed to mold problems is the growing popularity of cellulose insulation among knowledgeable home owners who are interested in sustainable building practices and energy conservation. Mycology experts (mycology is the study of mold) are often quoted as saying: "Mold grows on cellulose." They are referring to cellulose the generic material that forms the cell walls of all plants, not to cellulose insulation. Unfortunately, all too often this statement is taken to mean that cellulose insulation is exceptionally susceptible to mold contamination. In fact, due to its favorable moisture control characteristics and other factors associated with the manufacturing process relatively few cases of significant mold growth on cellulose insulation have been reported. All the widely publicized incidents of serious mold contamination of insulation have involved fiber insulation materials other than cellulose.".
- Moisture is always a concern for homes, and the wet-spray application of cellulose may not be a good choice in particularly wet climates unless the insulation can be verified to be dry before drywall is added. In very wet climates the use of a moisture meter will ensure proper installation and eliminate any installation mold issues (almost any insulation that becomes and remains wet can in the future cause a mold issue). The dry-spray application is another option for very wet climates, allowing for a faster installation (though the wet-spray cellulose has an even higher R-value and can increase wall rigidity).

=== US Health and Safety Partnership Program ===
In May 1999, the North American Insulation Manufacturers Association began implementing a comprehensive voluntary work practice partnership with the US Occupational Safety and Health Administration (OSHA). The program, known as the Health and Safety Partnership Program, or HSPP, promotes the safe handling and use of insulation materials and incorporates education and training for the manufacture, fabrication, installation and removal of fiber glass, rock wool and slag wool insulation products. (See health effects of fiberglass). (For authoritative and definitive information on fiber glass and rock and slag wool insulation, as well as the HSPP, consult the North American Insulation Manufacturers Association (NAIMA) website).

== See also ==
- Condensation
- Enovate
- Low-energy building
- Superinsulation
- Thermal mass
- Quadruple glazing
- Weatherization
