= Cementitious foam insulation =

Cement-based thermal and acoustic insulation

Cementitious foam insulation is a cement-based thermal and acoustic insulation, with an R-value similar to that of fiberglass. It is installed as a foam with a consistency like shaving cream, or as pre-cast slabs. The current cost is similar to that of polyurethane foams.

Unlike many foam-in-place polyurethane foams, it is nonflammable and non-toxic. As it is water-based, it offgasses water vapour while curing, requiring ventilation and in some cases a dehumidifier. It cures more slowly than organic foams. However, it does not offgas volatile organic compounds as many organic foams do. Like cement, it is water-soluble until cured, but after curing it is water-resistant, but water-permeable.

It does not expand on setting, but may shrink slightly in open cavities. Structurally, it does not resemble concrete; at the low densities that make it well-insulating, it is quite fragile. It can be crumbled away to re-expose wiring or pipes, making a pile of grey powder. Also unlike concrete, it is quite lightweight.

It is not a new product, having been around for some decades, but exclusive rights to an established cementitious foam product have recently been purchased by a company that has been giving it more publicity.
