= Light clay =

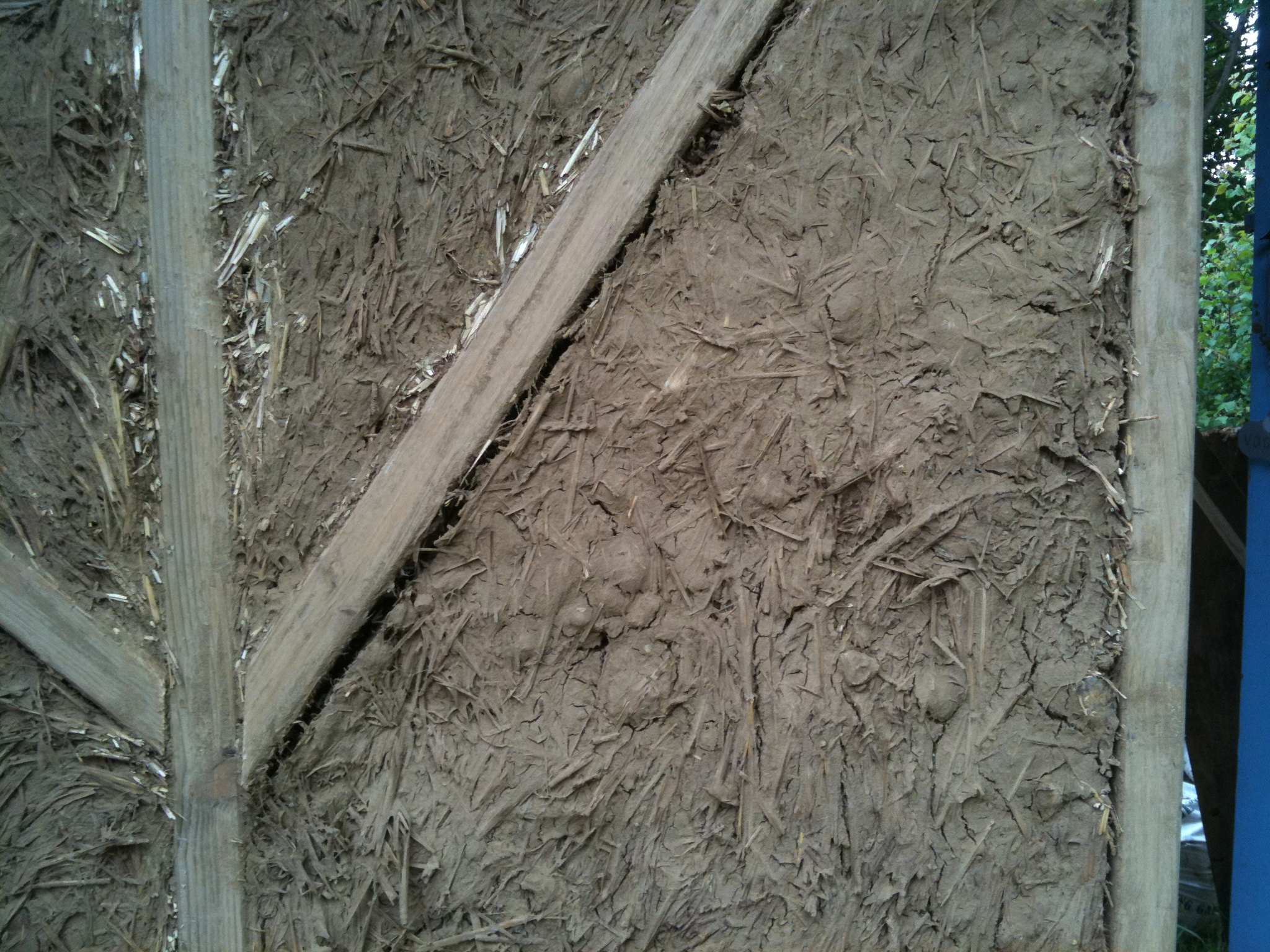
Example use of light clay within a timber frame before rendering

Light clay (also light straw clay, light clay straw, slipstraw) is a natural building material used to infill between a wooden frame in a timber framed building using a combination of clay and straw, woodchips or some other lighter material.

== History ==
A mixture of clay and straw was used as an infill material for timber framed building from at least the 12th century in Germany and elsewhere in Europe. The term "light clay" or "light straw-clay" derives from the German name Leichtlehmbau 'light clay construction'. Renewed interest in traditional building methods developed from the 1980s after which various natural building architects and builders started promoting the use of light clay. An appendix for light straw-clay was added to the International Residential Code beginning with the 2015 edition.

== Usage ==
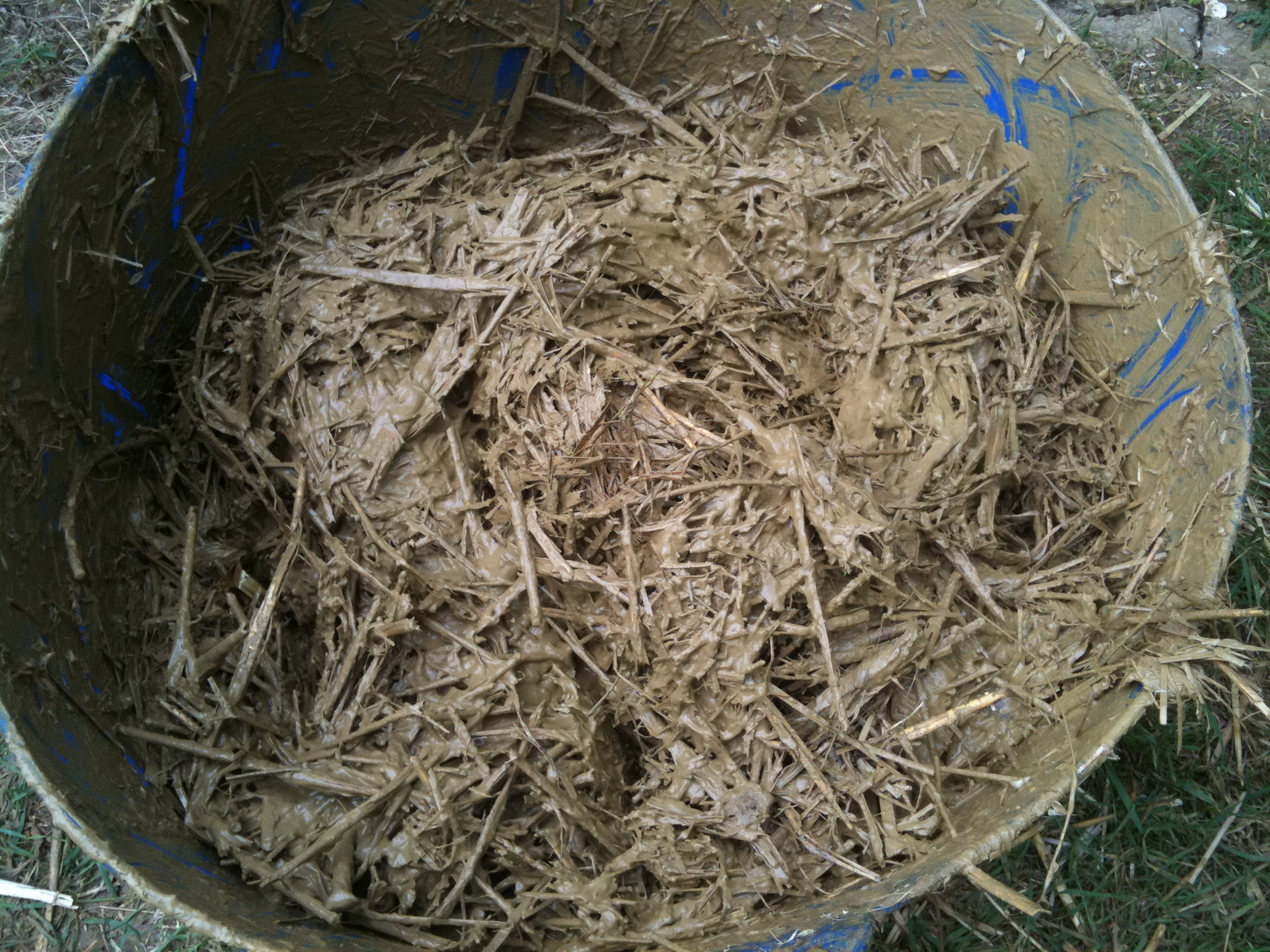
Light clay mixture consisting of clay, water and straw before application

Local clay, often local subsoil, is mixed into a slurry with water and then combined with straw or wood chip or other similar material. Wood chips can vary in size from sawdust to 5 centimetres (2.0 in) in diameter. The ratio of clay to other ingredients can be adapted to either increase thermal mass or insulation properties. The mixture is provided with additional structural strength using wattles. When used externally it can be protected with a Lime render or a clay render. A plaster or render yields a smooth, finished appearance.

== See also ==
- Adobe
- Cob
- Wattle and daub
- Wychert
