= Rice-hull bagwall construction =

Rice-hull bagwall construction is a system of building, with results aesthetically similar to the use of earthbag or cob construction. Woven polypropylene bags (or tubes) are tightly filled with raw rice hulls, and these are stacked up, layer upon layer, with strands of four-pronged barbed wire between. A surrounding "cage" composed of mats of welded or woven steel mesh (remesh or "poultry wire") on both sides (wired together between bag layers with, for example, rebar tie-wire) is then stuccoed to form building walls.

== Fireproofing ==
Mixing rice hulls in boric acid and borax solution results in fireproofing. A similar result can be achieved if placed on top of poured ingot, which applies direct heat until turned into ash. In addition, its ash form does not appeal to vermin.

== See also ==
- Earthbag construction
- Cob construction
