= Spring box =

Structure to get groundwater from springs

A spring box is a structure engineered to allow groundwater to be obtained from a natural spring. The spring box functions to protect the spring water from contamination, normally by surface runoff or contact with human and animals, and provides a point of collection and a place for sedimentation. In many instances it also acts as the principal water storage for the household water supply. The area surrounding the spring box should be fenced off in order to reduce the risk of contamination from animal feces. An overflow pipe should be installed into the spring box, as well as a sedimentation drain and the supply lines to & from it, and it should also have a well fitting lid.

If the flow rate is relatively high, a spring box may not be necessary. Instead, a pipe can be driven horizontally into the spring. These systems are sometimes known as horizontal wells, although the pipe should not be completely horizontal; it should slope downwards away from the spring in order to reduce the risk of contamination.
