= Lime render =

Building material

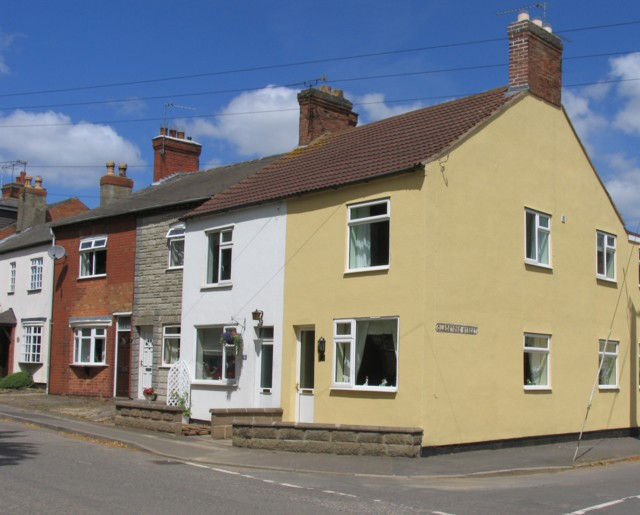
An old terrace with most of the brickwork obscured by rendering, paint and "stone" cladding. Image: Andrew Tatlow

Lime render is the first coat of lime "plaster or the like" applied to the external surfaces of traditionally-built stone or brick buildings.

It allows the building to 'breathe' – as lime is porous, it allows for the collection and evaporation of moisture. Portland cement in contrast, an often applied render for stone or brick buildings, traps moisture behind the stonework, which can result in the erosion of the masonry.

A lime render may be covered by a lime wash.
