= Rubble trench foundation =

Foundation construction approach

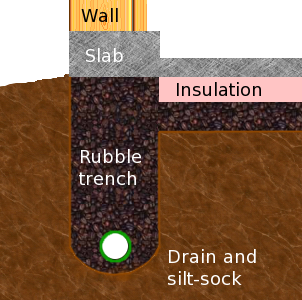
A cross section view of a rubble trench foundation

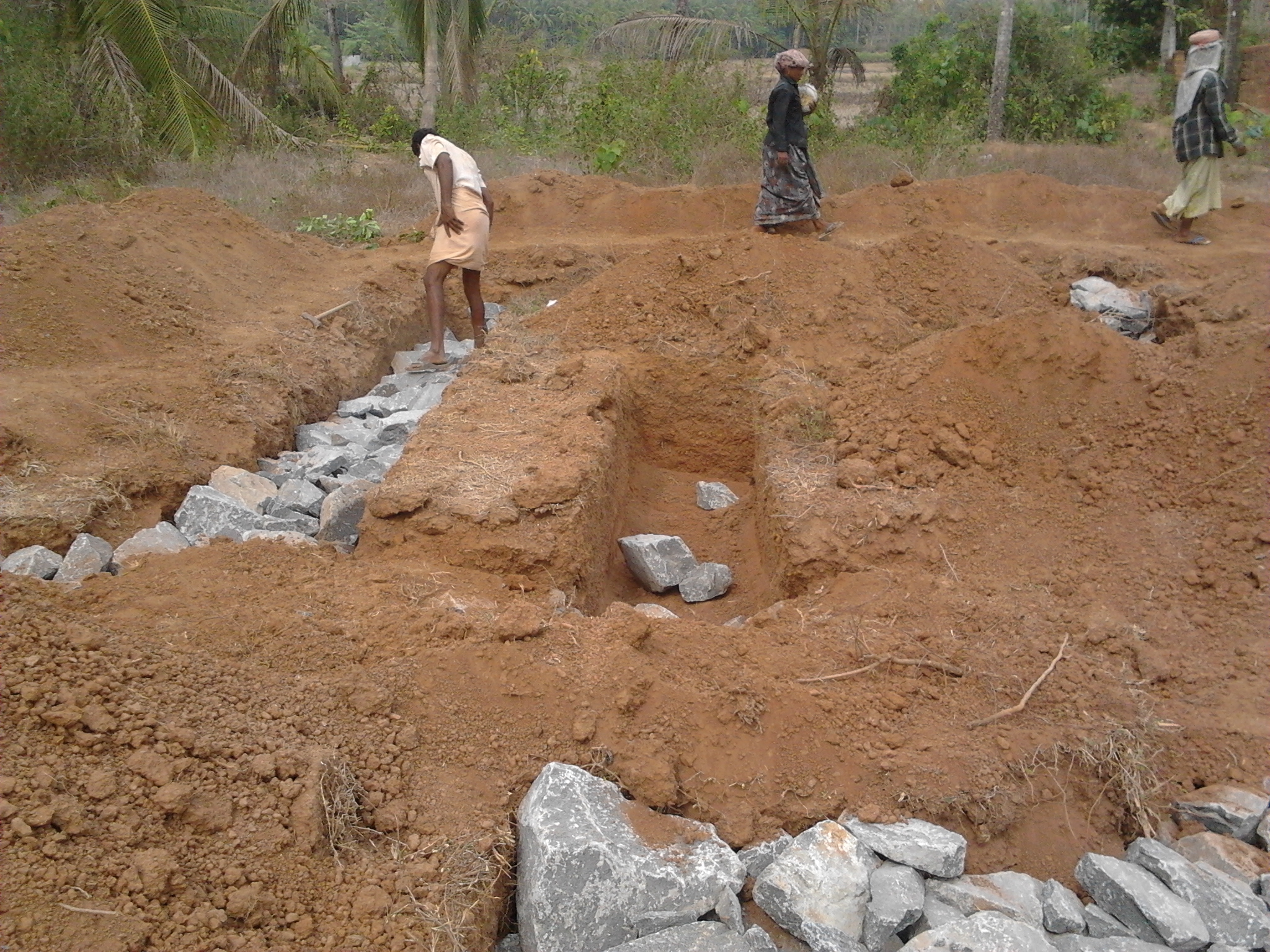
A rubble trench foundation

The rubble trench foundation, an ancient construction approach popularized by architect Frank Lloyd Wright, is a type of foundation that uses loose stone or rubble to minimize the use of concrete and improve drainage. It is considered more environmentally friendly than other types of foundation because cement manufacturing requires the use of enormous amounts of energy. However, some soil environments are not suitable for this kind of foundation, particularly expansive or poor load-bearing (< ~100 kN/m² or 1 ton/sf) soils. A rubble trench foundation with a concrete grade beam is not recommended for earthquake prone areas.

A foundation must bear the structural loads imposed upon it and allow proper drainage of ground water to prevent expansion or weakening of soils and frost heaving. While the far more common concrete foundation requires separate measures to ensure good soil drainage, the rubble trench foundation serves both foundation functions at once.

To construct a rubble trench foundation, a narrow trench is dug down in the ground below the frost line. The bottom of the trench would ideally be gently sloped to an outlet. Drainage tile, graded 1cm/m or 1":8' to daylight, is then placed at the bottom of the trench in a bed of washed stone protected by filter fabric. The trench is then filled with either screened stone (typically 1-1/2") or recycled rubble. A steel-reinforced concrete grade beam may be poured at the surface to provide ground clearance for the structure.

If an insulated slab is to be poured inside the grade beam, then the outer surface of the grade beam and the rubble trench should be insulated with rigid XPS foam board, which must be protected above grade from mechanical and UV degradation.

The rubble-trench foundation is a relatively simple, inexpensive, and environment-friendly alternative to a conventional foundation, but may require an engineer's approval if building officials are not familiar with it. Frank Lloyd Wright used them successfully for more than 50 years in the first half of the 20th century, and there is a revival of this style of foundation with the increased interest in green building.
