= Straw-bale construction =

Building method that uses bales of straw

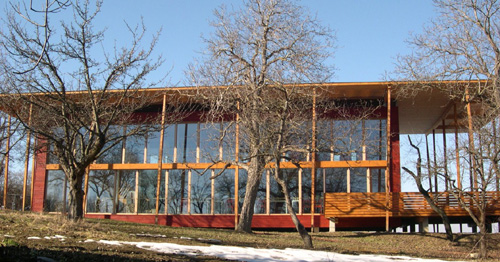
An upscale use of straw bale insulation combined with energy-efficient passive features

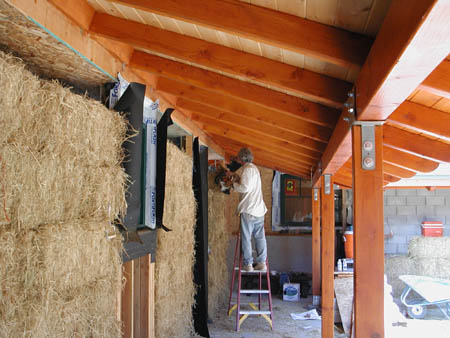
Straw bale construction project in Willits, California

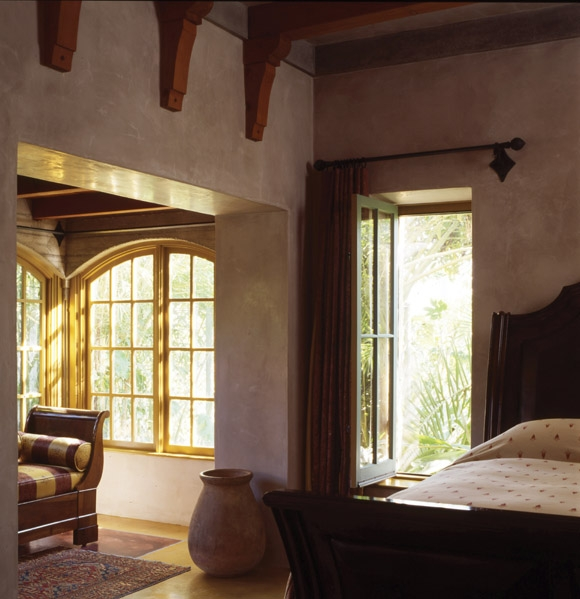
Example of an SMS straw bale home

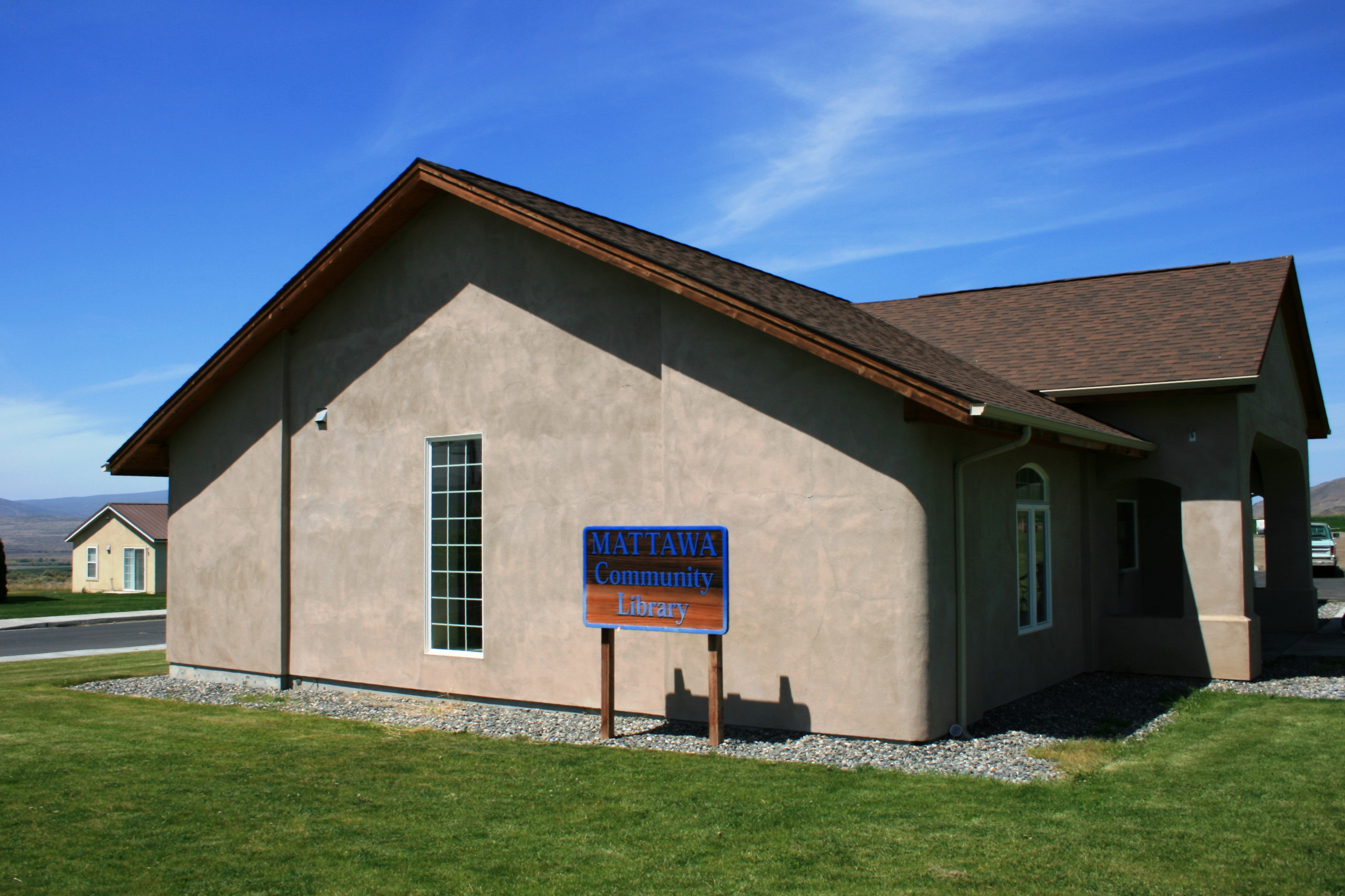
Exterior view of straw bale library in Mattawa, Washington taken in 2008 (constructed 2002 by IronStraw Group)

Straw-bale construction is a building method that uses bales of straw (usually wheat straw) as structural elements, building insulation, or both. This construction method is commonly used in natural building or "brown" construction projects. Research has shown that straw-bale construction is a sustainable method for building, from the standpoint of both materials and energy needed for heating and cooling.

Advantages of straw-bale construction over conventional building systems include the renewable nature of straw, cost, easy availability, natural fire-retardant and high insulation value. Disadvantages include susceptibility to rot, difficulty in obtaining insurance coverage, and high space requirements for the straw itself. Research has been done using moisture probes placed within the straw wall in which 7 of 8 locations had moisture contents of less than 20%. This is a moisture level that does not aid in the breakdown of the straw. However, proper construction of the straw-bale wall is important in keeping moisture levels down, just as in the construction of any type of building.

== History ==
Straw houses have been built on the African plains since the Paleolithic Era. Straw was used in construction 400 years ago in Germany; and straw-thatched roofs have long been used in northern Europe and Asia. When European Settlers came to North America, teepees were insulated in winter with loose straw between the inner lining and outer cover.

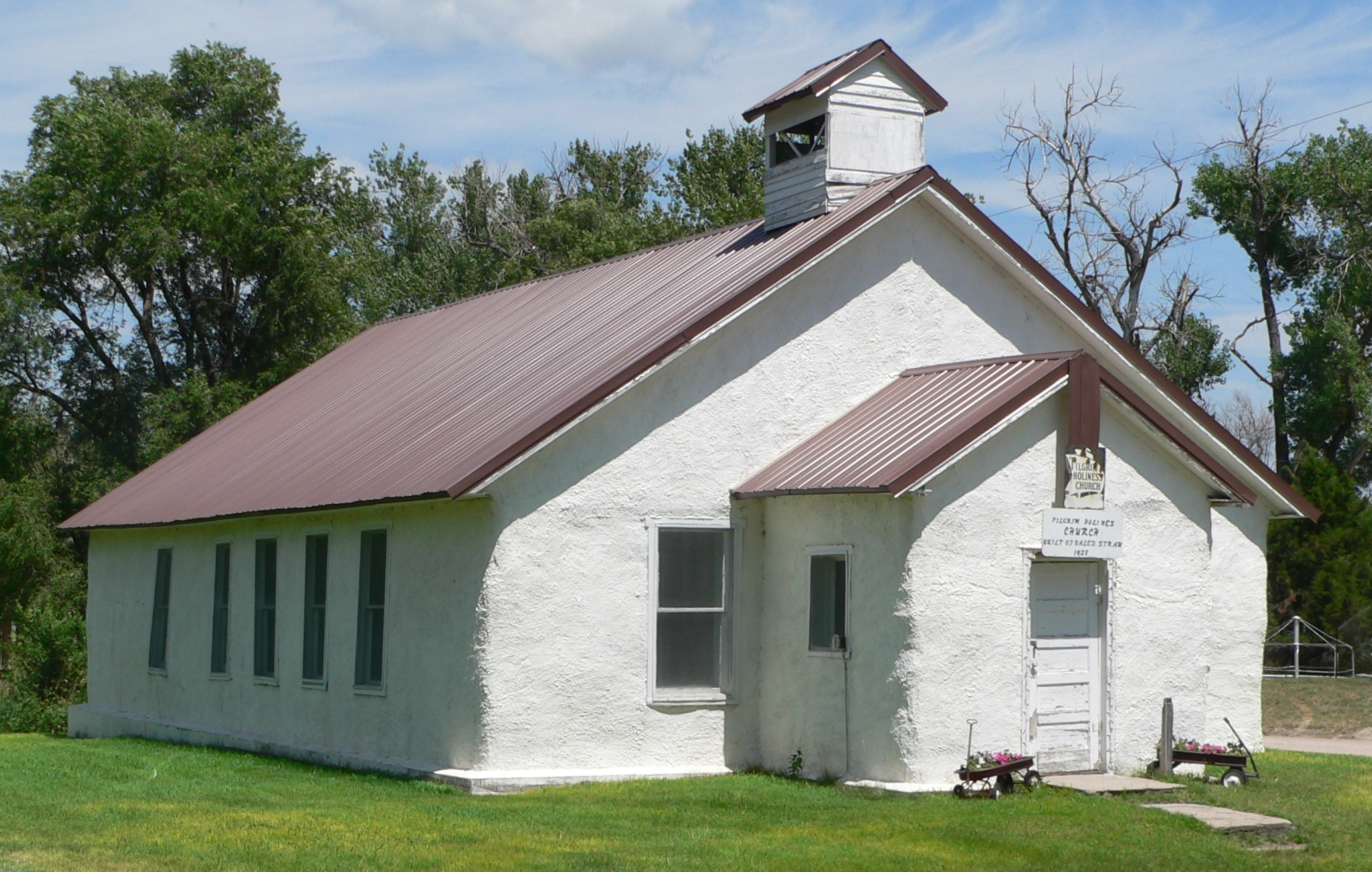
Pilgrim Holiness Church in Arthur, Nebraska

Straw-bale construction was greatly facilitated by the mechanical hay baler, which was invented in the 1850s and was widespread by the 1890s. It proved particularly useful in the Nebraska Sandhills. Pioneers seeking land under the 1862 Homestead Act and the 1904 Kinkaid Act found a dearth of trees over much of Nebraska. In many parts of the state, the soil was suitable for dugouts and sod houses. However, in the Sandhills, the soil generally made poor construction sod; in the few places where suitable sod could be found, it was more valuable for agriculture than as a building material.

The first documented use of hay bales in construction in Nebraska was a schoolhouse built in 1896 or 1897. Unfenced and unprotected by stucco or plaster, it was reported in 1902 as having been eaten by cows. To combat this, builders began plastering their bale structures; if cement or lime stucco was unavailable, locally obtained "gumbo mud" was employed. Between 1896 and 1945, an estimated 70 straw-bale buildings, including houses, farm buildings, churches, schools, offices, and grocery stores had been built in the Sandhills. In 1990, nine surviving bale buildings were reported in Arthur and Logan Counties, including the 1928 Pilgrim Holiness Church in the village of Arthur, which is listed in the National Register of Historic Places.

Since the 1990s straw-bale construction has been substantially revived, particularly in North America, Europe, and Australia. Straw was one of the first materials to be used in green buildings. This revival is likely attributed to greater environmental awareness and the material's natural, non-toxic qualities, low embodied energy, and relative affordability. Straw-bale construction has encountered issues regarding building codes depending on the location of the building. However, in the USA, the introduction of Appendices S and R in the 2015 International Residential Code has helped to legitimize and improve understanding of straw-bale construction. In France, the approval in 2012 of professional rules for straw-building recognized it as “common technology” and qualifies for standard-insurance programs.

== Method ==
Straw bale building typically consists of stacking rows of bales (often in running-bond) on a raised footing or foundation, with a moisture barrier or capillary break between the bales and their supporting platform. There are two types of straw-bales commonly used, those bound together with two strings and those with three. The three string bale is the larger in all three dimensions. Bale walls can be tied together with pins of bamboo or wood (internal to the bales or on their faces), or with surface wire meshes, and then stuccoed or plastered, either with a lime-based formulation or earth/clay render. The bales may actually provide the structural support for the building ("load-bearing" or "Nebraska-style" technique), as was the case in the original examples from the late 19th century. The plastered bale assembly also can be designed to provide lateral and shear support for wind and seismic loads.

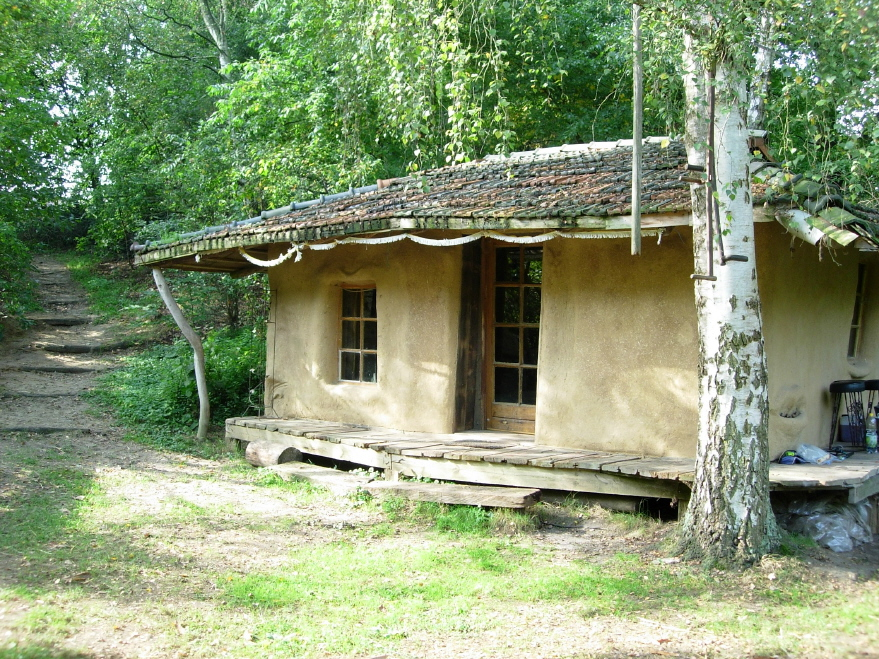
This straw bale house plastered with loam earthen plaster is located in Swalmen, in the southeastern Netherlands.

Alternatively, bale buildings can have a structural frame of other materials, usually lumber or timber-frame, with bales simply serving as insulation and plaster substrate, ("infill" or "non-loadbearing" technique), which is most often required in northern regions and/or in wet climates. In northern regions, the potential snow-loading can exceed the strength of the bale walls. In wet climates, the imperative for applying a vapor-permeable finish precludes the use of cement-based stucco. Additionally, the inclusion of a skeletal framework of wood or metal allows the erection of a roof prior to raising the bales, which can protect the bale wall during construction, when it is the most vulnerable to water damage in all but the most dependably arid climates. A combination of framing and load-bearing techniques may also be employed, referred to as "hybrid" straw bale construction.

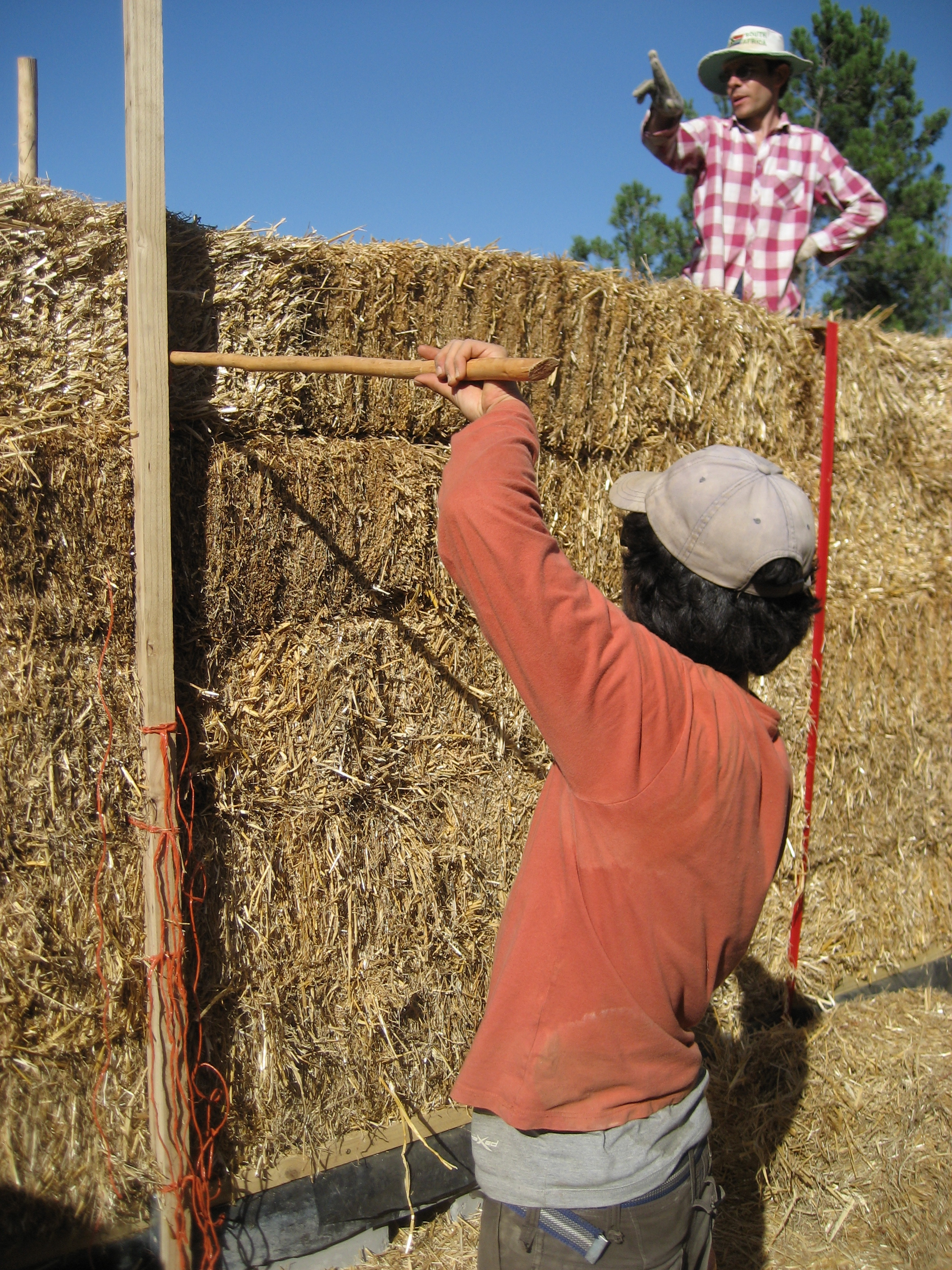
Straw bale construction

Straw bales can also be used as part of a spar and membrane structure (SMS) wall system in which lightly reinforced 5–8 cm (2.0–3.1 in) sprayed concrete skins are interconnected with extended X-shaped light rebar in the head joints of the bales. In this wall system the concrete skins provide structure, seismic reinforcing, and fireproofing, while the bales are used as leave-in formwork and insulation.

The University of Bath has completed a research programme which used ‘ModCell’ panels—prefabricated panels consisting of a wooden structural frame infilled with straw bales and rendered with a breathable lime-based system—to build 'BaleHaus', a straw bale construction on the university's campus. Monitoring work of the structure carried out by architectural researchers at the university has found that as well as reducing the environmental footprint, the construction offers other benefits, including healthier living through higher levels of thermal insulation and regulation of humidity levels. The group has published a number of research papers on its findings.

High density pre-compressed bales (straw blocks) can bear higher loads than traditional field bales (bales created with baling machines on farms). While field bales support around 900 kilograms per metre (600 lb/ft) of wall length, high-density bales can bear at least 6,000 kg/m (4,000 lb/ft).

Bale buildings can also be constructed of non-straw bales—such as those made from recycled material such as tires, cardboard, paper, plastic, and carpeting—and even bags containing "bales" of wood chips or rice hulls.

Straw bales have also been used in very energy efficient high-performance buildings such as the S-House in Austria which meets the Passivhaus energy standard. In South Africa, a five-star lodge made from 10,000 strawbales has housed world leaders Nelson Mandela and Tony Blair. In the Swiss Alps, in the little village of Nax Mont-Noble, construction works have begun in October 2011 for the first hotel in Europe built entirely with straw bales. The Harrison Vault, in Joshua Tree, California, is engineered to withstand the high seismic loads in that area using only the assembly consisting of bales, lath and plaster. The technique was used successfully for strawbale housing in rural China. Straw bale domes along the Syrio-African rift at Kibbutz Lotan have an interior geodesic frame of steel pipes. Another method to reap the benefits of straw is to incorporate straw-bale walls into a pre-existing structure.

Straw bales are widely used to insulate walls, but they may also be used to insulate roofs and sub-floors.

== Thermal properties ==
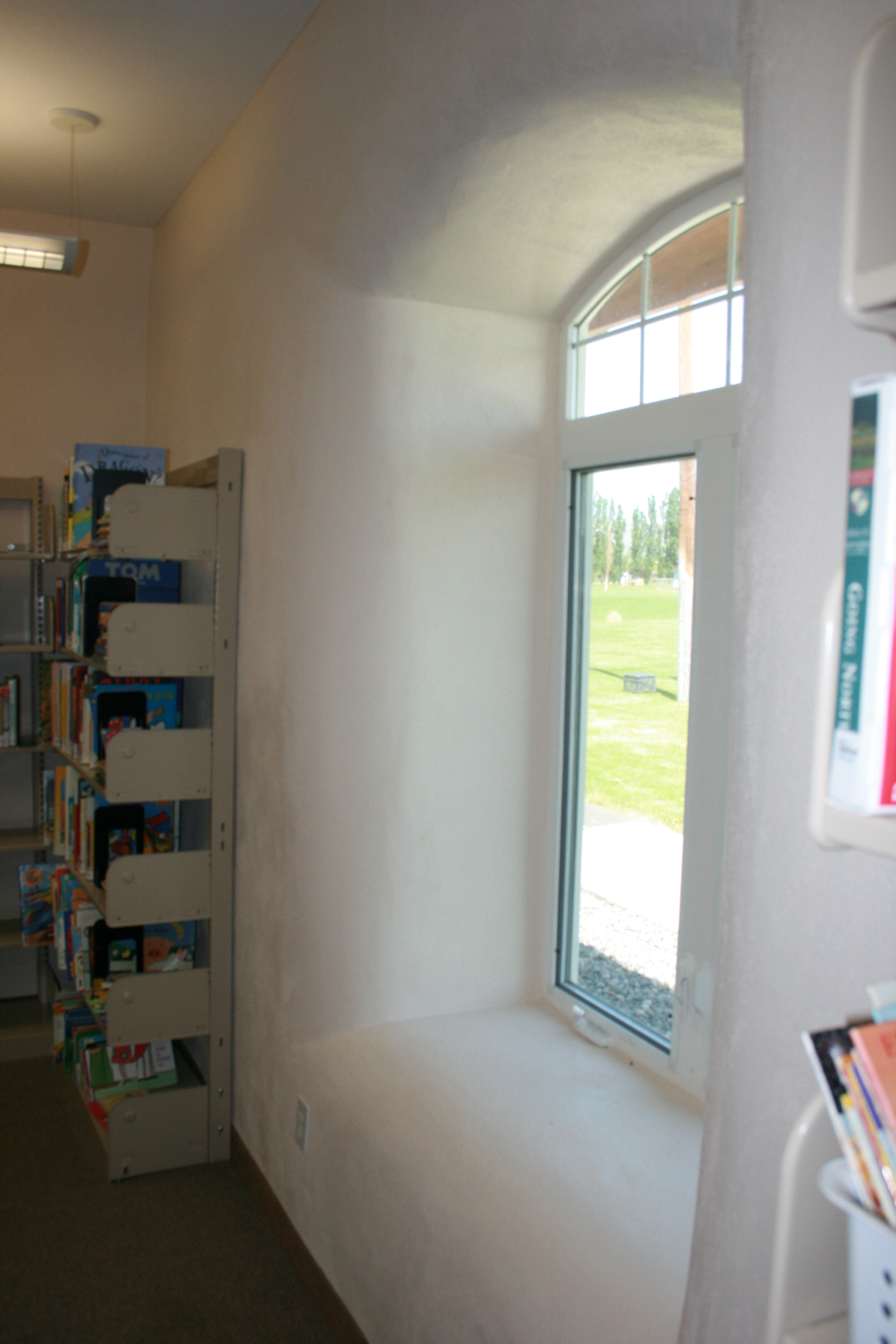
Interior view of straw bale library

Compressed straw bales have a wide range of documented R-value. R-value is a measurement of a materials insulating quality, higher the number the more insulating. The reported R-value ranges from 17–55 (in American units) or 3–9.6 (in SI) depending on the study, differing wall designs could be responsible for wide range in R-value. given that the bales are over a foot thick, the R-value per inch is lower than most other commercial insulation types including batts (3–4) and foamboard (~5). Bale walls are typically coated with a thick layer of plaster, which provides a well-distributed thermal mass, active on a short-term (diurnal) cycle. The combination of insulation and mass provide an excellent platform for passive solar building design for winter and summer.

In common with most building materials, there is a degree of uncertainty in the thermal conductivity due to the influences of temperature, moisture content and density. However, from evaluation of a range of literature and experimental data, a value of 0.064 W/m·K is regarded as a representative design value for straw bales at the densities typically used in building construction.

Compressed and plastered straw bale walls are also resistant to fire.

The hygrothermal properties of straw bales have been measured and reviewed in several technical papers. According to research, the thermal conductivity does not differ significantly depending on the type of straw. Samples with densities between 63 and 350 kg/m^{3} have been analysed. The best performing was characterised by a thermal conductivity of 0.038 W m^{−1} K^{−1}. Marques et al., Reif et al. and Cascone et al. indicate that the thermal conductivity of straw is relatively insensitive to bale density. The thermal conductivity of straw bales has been shown to differ with the direction of the straw's orientation within the bale, with straws with fibres oriented perpendicularly or randomly to the heat flow having lower thermal conductivity than those arranged in parallel. For different temperatures and densities, Vjelien studied four variations of the same kind of straw: two variations concerned the direction of the fibres in relation to the heat flow: perpendicular and parallel, and the other two concerned the macrostructure chopped straw and defibrated straw. The thermal conductivity of the defibrated straw was lower than that of the chopped straw.

=== Efficiency ===
The use of straw bales as thermal insulation in buildings has been studied by many authors. They mainly focus on the straw’s thermal and hygrothermal properties. The findings showed that using straw in construction improves energy, environmental, and economic efficiency:

Some studies have evaluated the advantages of using straw bales for building insulation. Measurements carried out in an innovative and sustainable house built in France have shown that this material helps to minimize heating degrees and energy consumption. The simulated heating requirements in the winter are calculated to be 59 kW h/m^{2}. In Italy, the energy-saving potential of a straw wall was assessed under various climatic conditions. As compared to the Italian regulations’ reference of a Net Zero Energy Building (NZEB), the straw wall performed extremely well in terms of energy efficiency. The embodied energy of a straw wall structure is about half that of a conventional wall assembly, and the corresponding CO_{2} emissions are more than 40% lower. Furthermore, in the summer, straw bale walls provide significant thermal inertia.

Liuzzi et al. compared expanded polystyrene (EPS), straw fibre, and olive fibre in a hygrothermal simulation of a flat in two different climatic zones (Bari and Bilbao), assuming a retrofit via interior panels. The simulation results show that the annual energy requirement when using straw fibre and olive fibre panels is close to the annual energy requirement for expanded polystyrene panels in both climates. During the cooling season, however, olive fibre and straw fibre insulation panels perform better, with a reduction of approximately 21% in Bilbao and 14% in Bari.

Straw has a thermal conductivity similar to that of common insulating materials. It has a thermal conductivity of 0.038–0.08 W m^{−1} K^{−1}, which is comparable to other wood fibre insulation materials. To achieve the same thermal insulation efficiency as other more insulating materials such as extruded and extended polystyrene, the thickness of the straw insulation layer should be increased by 30–90%.

== Problems with straw-bale ==
Two significant problems related to straw-bale construction are moisture and mold. During the construction phase, buildings need to be protected from rain and from water leakages into the body of the walls. If exposed to water, compressed straw may expand due to absorption of moisture. In turn, this can cause more cracking through which more moisture can infiltrate. Further damage to the wall can be caused by mold releasing potentially toxic spores into the wall cavities and into the air. In hot climates, where walls may have become internally dampened, internal temperatures may rise (due to decomposition of affected straw). Rats and mice can infiltrate straw bale homes during construction, so care must be taken to keep such animals out of the material. Other problems relate to straw dust which may cause breathing difficulties among people with allergies to straw or hay.

Several companies have developed prefabricated straw bale walls. A passive ecological house can easily be assembled with those panels.

== See also ==
- Truth window
- Wintergreen Studios
