= Arthur Municipal Airport =

- IATA: none; ICAO: none; FAA LID: 38V

Summary
- Airport type: Public
- Owner: City of Arthur
- Serves: Arthur, Nebraska
- Elevation AMSL: 3,646 ft / 1,111 m
- Coordinates: 41°33′42″N 101°42′41″W
- Interactive map of Arthur Municipal Airport

Runways
Direction	Length		Surface
Direction	ft	m	Surface
6/24	2,700	823	Turf

Statistics (2003)
- Aircraft operations: 25
- Source: Federal Aviation Administration,

Arthur Municipal Airport (FAA LID: 38V) is a city-owned public-use airport located one nautical mile (1.2 mi; 1.9 km) southwest of the central business district of Arthur, in Arthur County, Nebraska, United States.

== Facilities and aircraft ==
Arthur Municipal Airport covers an area of 50 acres (20 ha) at an elevation of 3,646 feet (1,111 m) above mean sea level. It has one runway designated 6/24 with a turf surface measuring 2,700 by 200 feet (823 by 61 m). For the 12-month period ending June 24, 2003, the airport had 25 general aviation aircraft operations: 60% local and 40% transient.
