= Pilgrim Holiness Church (Arthur, Nebraska) =

Historic church in Nebraska, United States

- U.S. National Register of Historic Places
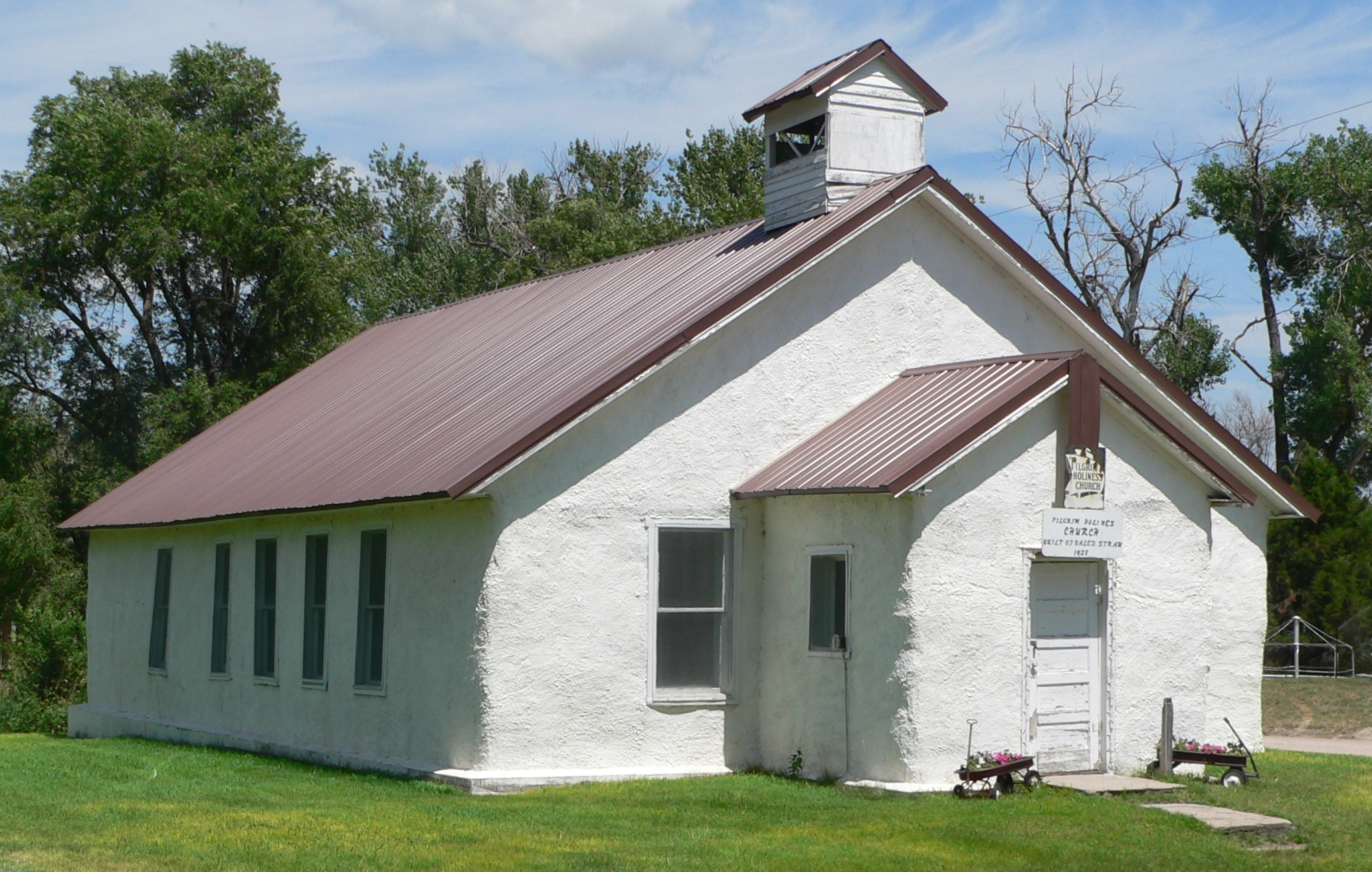
- View from the southwest

- Location within Nebraska Location within the United States
- Location: Northwest corner of Cedar and Heath Streets, Arthur, Nebraska
- Coordinates: 41°34′15″N 101°41′18.7″W
- Built: 1928
- NRHP reference No.: 79001434
- Added to NRHP: June 18, 1979

The Pilgrim Holiness Church, also known as the Baled Hay Church or the Baled Straw Church, is a church built in 1928 in Arthur, Nebraska. At a time and place in which conventional construction materials were expensive or unavailable, it was built out of baled rye straw. For its unique mode of construction, associated with the history of settlement of the Nebraska Sandhills, it is listed in the National Register of Historic Places.

== Settlement of Arthur County ==
Arthur County lies in the Nebraska Sandhills, a region of grass-stabilized sand dunes. Rainfall percolates readily into the sandy soil, recharging the aquifer and giving rise to hundreds of permanent lakes; but the sandy soil is poorly suited for cultivation, and the area is chiefly used for cattle ranching.

Much of eastern Nebraska was settled under the provisions of the 1862 Homestead Act, which allowed settlers to obtain a quarter-section (160 acres, or 65 ha) of government land for a nominal fee. In the Sandhills, this was not enough land to support a family, and the usual pattern of development was one of large cattle ranches on federal land, with the ranchers using the homestead laws to secure lakes and streams for their operations.

The 1904 Kinkaid Act allowed homesteaders in 37 western Nebraska counties to claim a full section (640 acres, or 260 ha) of government land. This, combined with the opening of a forest reserve in 1911, led to rapid population growth in what is now Arthur County. The county itself was created by the Nebraska legislature in its 1912-13 session, and the townsite of Arthur was designated the county seat in 1913. By the 1920 census, the county had a population of 1412, compared to an 1890 population of 91 for what is now Logan and Arthur counties.

== Straw bale construction ==
The first settlers on the Nebraska prairies found few trees there, necessitating a search for locally available construction materials. In other parts of the state, the soil proved suitable for dugouts and sod houses. However, in the Sandhills, the soil generally made poor construction sod; in the few places where suitable sod could be found, it was more valuable for agriculture than as a building material. No railroad lines reached Arthur County, so importing construction materials would have been expensive and difficult.

The mechanical hay baler had been invented in the 1850s, and was in widespread use by the 1890s. The first documented use of hay bales in construction in Nebraska was a schoolhouse built in 1896 or 1897; unfenced and unprotected by stucco or plaster, it was reported in 1902 as having been eaten by cows. Between 1896 and 1945, an estimated 70 straw-bale buildings, including houses, farm buildings, churches, schools, offices, and grocery stores had been built in the Sandhills. In 1990, nine surviving bale buildings were reported in Arthur and Logan Counties.

== Pilgrim Holiness Church ==
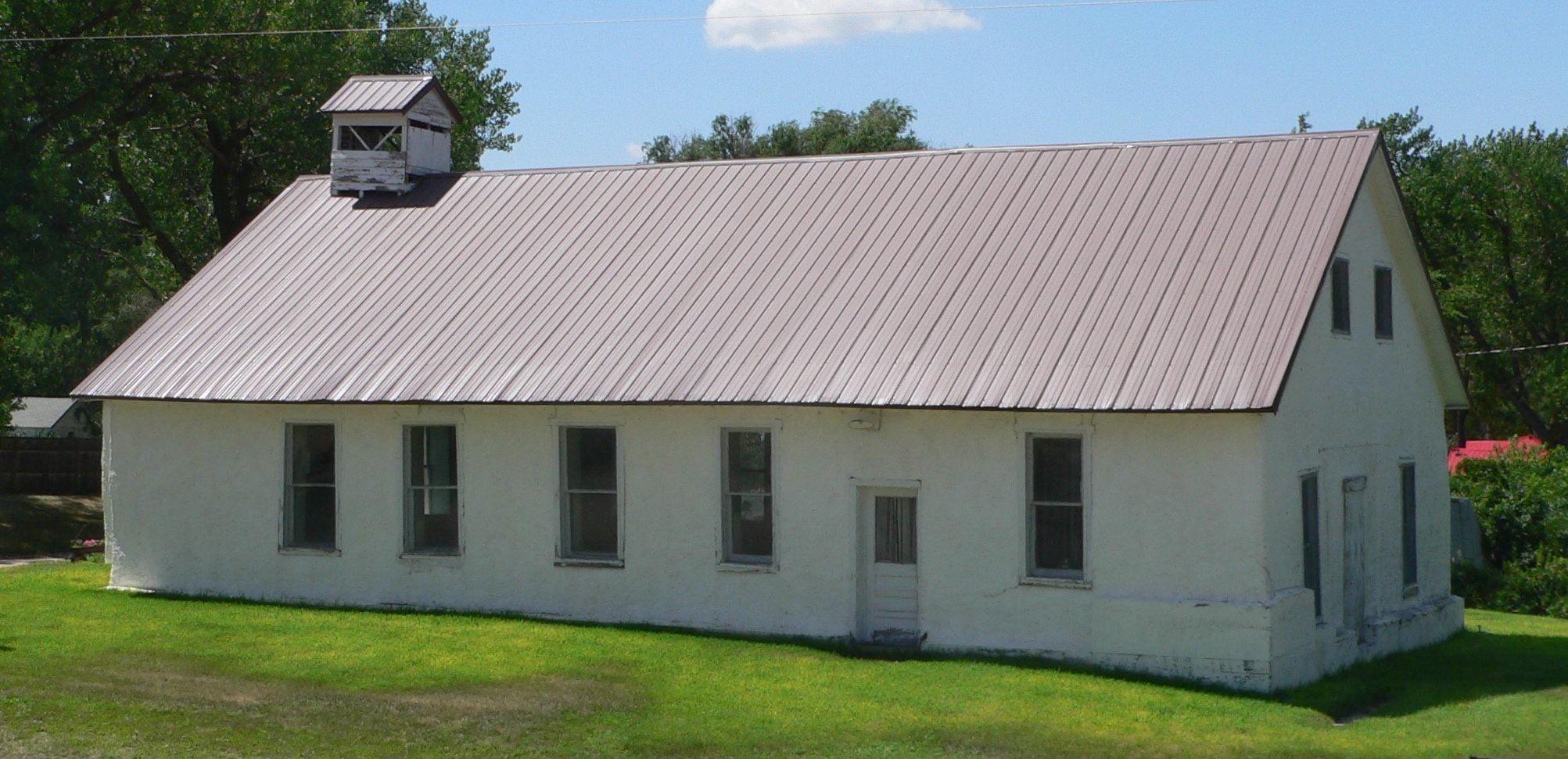
View from the northeast

In 1927, a group of Congregationalists in Arthur began planning a church. The building, constructed in the following year, was constructed of stacked and baled hay with walls 2 feet (60 cm) thick. The building is now stuccoed on the outside and plastered on the inside, but in the course of renovations in 1976, it was determined that it had originally been plastered on both sides with locally obtained "gumbo mud".

Pilgrim Holiness Church is the oldest known straw-bale church in North America, and one of three known to exist today. The others are a church built in 1954 near Sexsmith, Alberta, and St. Francis in the Redwoods, built in 2007 in Willits, California.

Regular services are no longer held in the church, which is now owned and operated by the Arthur County Historical Society. The property was listed on the National Register of Historic Places in 1979.
