= Bucktail =

Bucktail may refer to:

- Bucktails, the name of a political faction in New York State or the 13th Pennsylvania Reserves, an American Civil War unit
- Bucktail State Park Natural Area, Pennsylvania
- Bucktail, Nebraska, an unincorporated community
- Buck-tail, the end opposite the head of a rivet
- Bucktail, a type of jig or fishing lure (see jigging)
