= Beneficio =

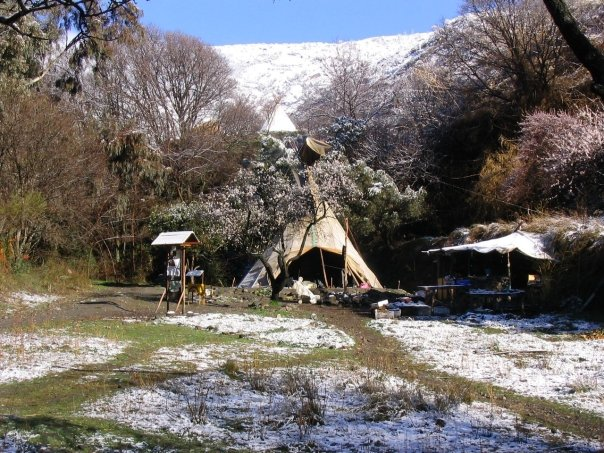
- Beneficio community tent
- Interactive map of Beneficio
- Coordinates: 36°55′20.5″N 3°26′6.5″W
- Country: Spain
- Autonomous community: Andalusia
- Province: Granada
- Established: 1987

Area
  - Total: 3 km^{2} (1.2 sq mi)
- Elevation: 550 m (1,800 ft)

Population (2011)
  - Total: 200
  - Density: 67/km^{2} (170/sq mi)
- Time zone: UTC+1 (CET)
  - Summer (DST): UTC+2 (CEST)

Beneficio is an intentional community in southern Spain. It consists of a plot co-owned by many residents in a river valley, outside of the Alpujarras village of Órgiva.

Inhabitants live largely in various styles of light shelters such as tents, benders and tipis, although some more permanent structures have been built, including straw bale constructions. There is also a number of people living in vehicles along the dirt road that leads up to the Beneficio valley. A part of the settlement is illegal under Spanish law and the Junta has been evicting its inhabitants since spring 2013. Inside Beneficio there are small businesses, including a shop, bakeries, free range eggs, and cheese making. There are shared facilities including a large communal tipi, communal garden, shared outdoor kitchen, composting toilet, and a sports pitch. Drinking water is provided by a mountain spring, and secondary water is provided by the stream running through the valley.

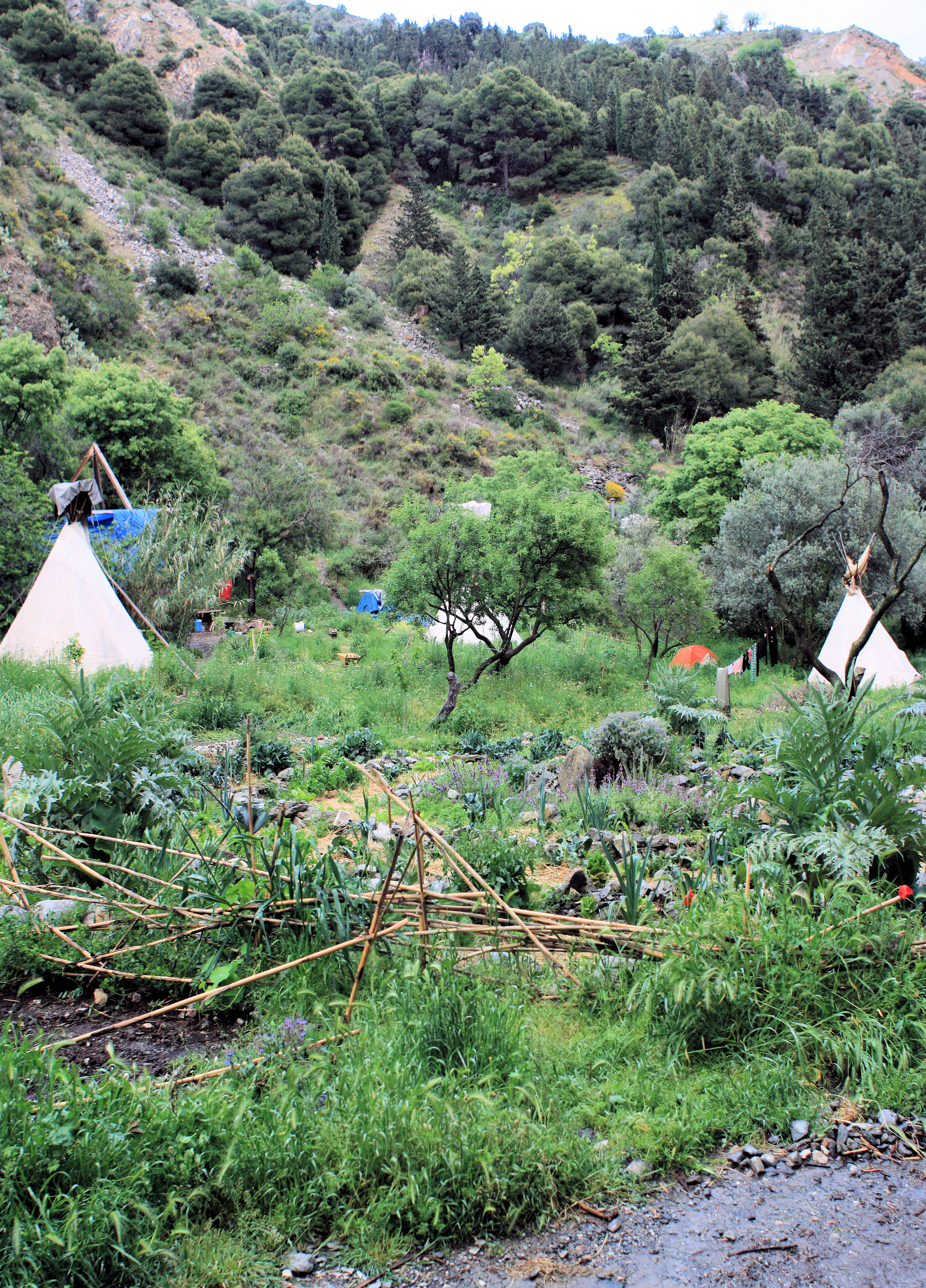
Tipis and gardens in Beneficio, April 2011.
