= Calora, Nebraska =

Unincorporated community in Nebraska, United States

- Unincorporated Community
- Location within Nebraska Location within the United States
- Coordinates: 41.6°N 101.4°W
- Country: United States
- State: Nebraska
- County: Arthur

Calora is an unincorporated community in Arthur County, Nebraska, United States.

== History ==
A post office was established at Calora in 1912, and remained in operation until it was discontinued in 1951. The community's name is an amalgamation of Carl and Oura.
