= First Arthur County Courthouse and Jail =

- U.S. National Register of Historic Places
- U.S. Historic district
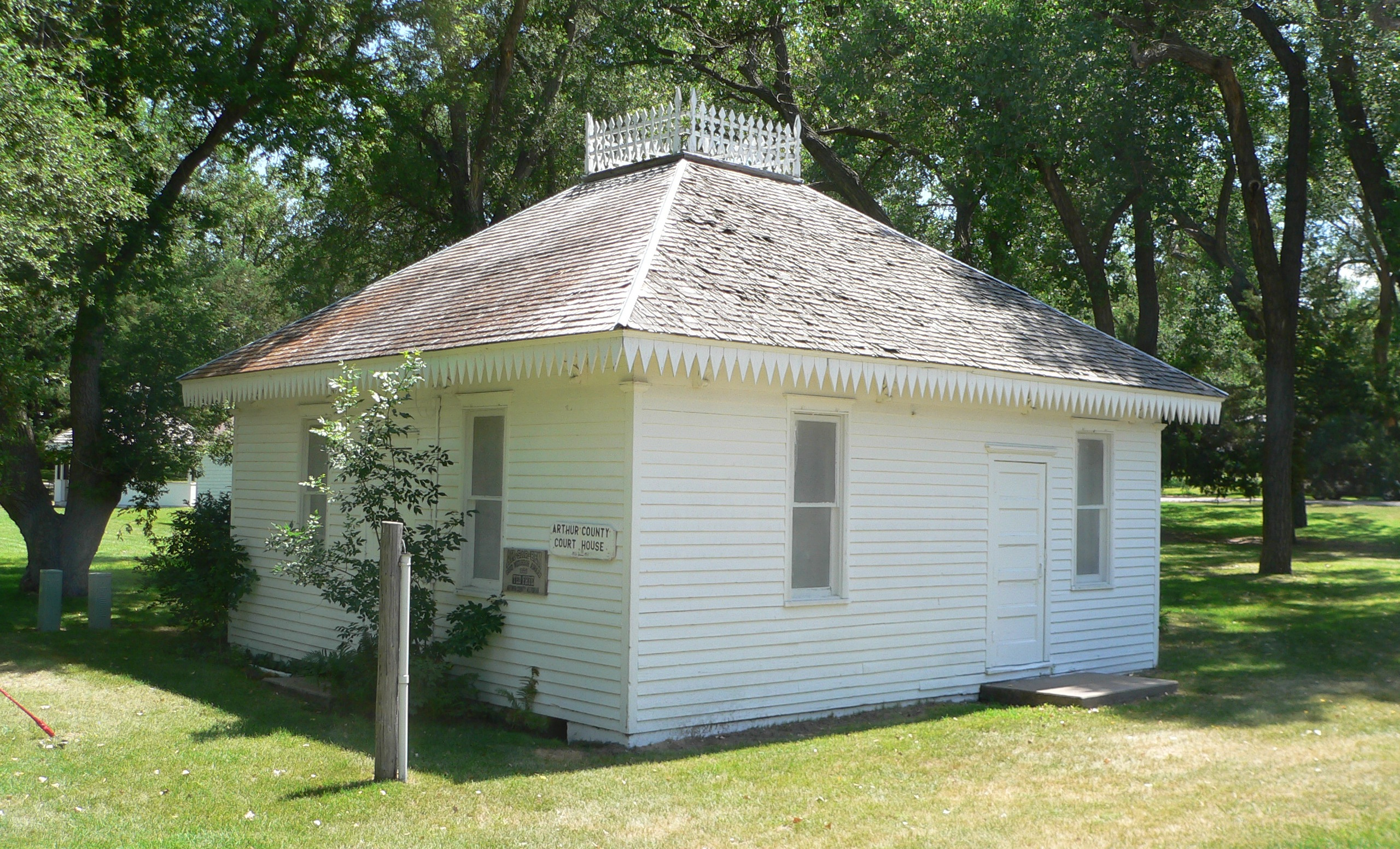

- Location within Nebraska Location within the United States
- Location: Marshall St. between Fir and Elm Sts., Arthur, Nebraska
- Coordinates: 41°34′12″N 101°41′25″W
- Area: 1 acre (0.40 ha)
- Built: 1914
- Architect: Noll, J.S.
- Architectural style: Italianate
- MPS: County Courthouses of Nebraska MPS
- NRHP reference No.: 89002241
- Added to NRHP: January 10, 1990

The First Arthur County Courthouse and Jail, was perhaps the smallest court house in the United States, and serves now as a museum.

Located at Marshall St. between Fir and Elm Sts. in Arthur, Nebraska, the 26-by-28-foot (7.9 m × 8.5 m) courthouse building was built in 1914, and the jail was built in 1915, as the first government buildings in newly formed Arthur County. The courthouse was designed by a J.S. Noll with some elements of Italianate style. The property was listed on the National Register of Historic Places in 1990; the listing included two contributing buildings.
