= Velma, Nebraska =

Unincorporated community in Nebraska, U.S.

Coordinates: 41°37′53″N 101°56′31″W

Velma is an unincorporated community in Arthur County, Nebraska, United States.

== History ==
A post office was established at Velma in 1914, and remained in operation until 1943.
