= Lena, Nebraska =

Unincorporated community in Nebraska, U.S.

Coordinates: 41°42′04″N 101°29′55″W

Lena is an unincorporated community in Arthur County, Nebraska, United States.

== History ==
Lena was named for Mrs. Lena Fellows, its first postmaster.
