= Cordwood construction =

Wall construction from pieces of wood bonded with mortar or clay

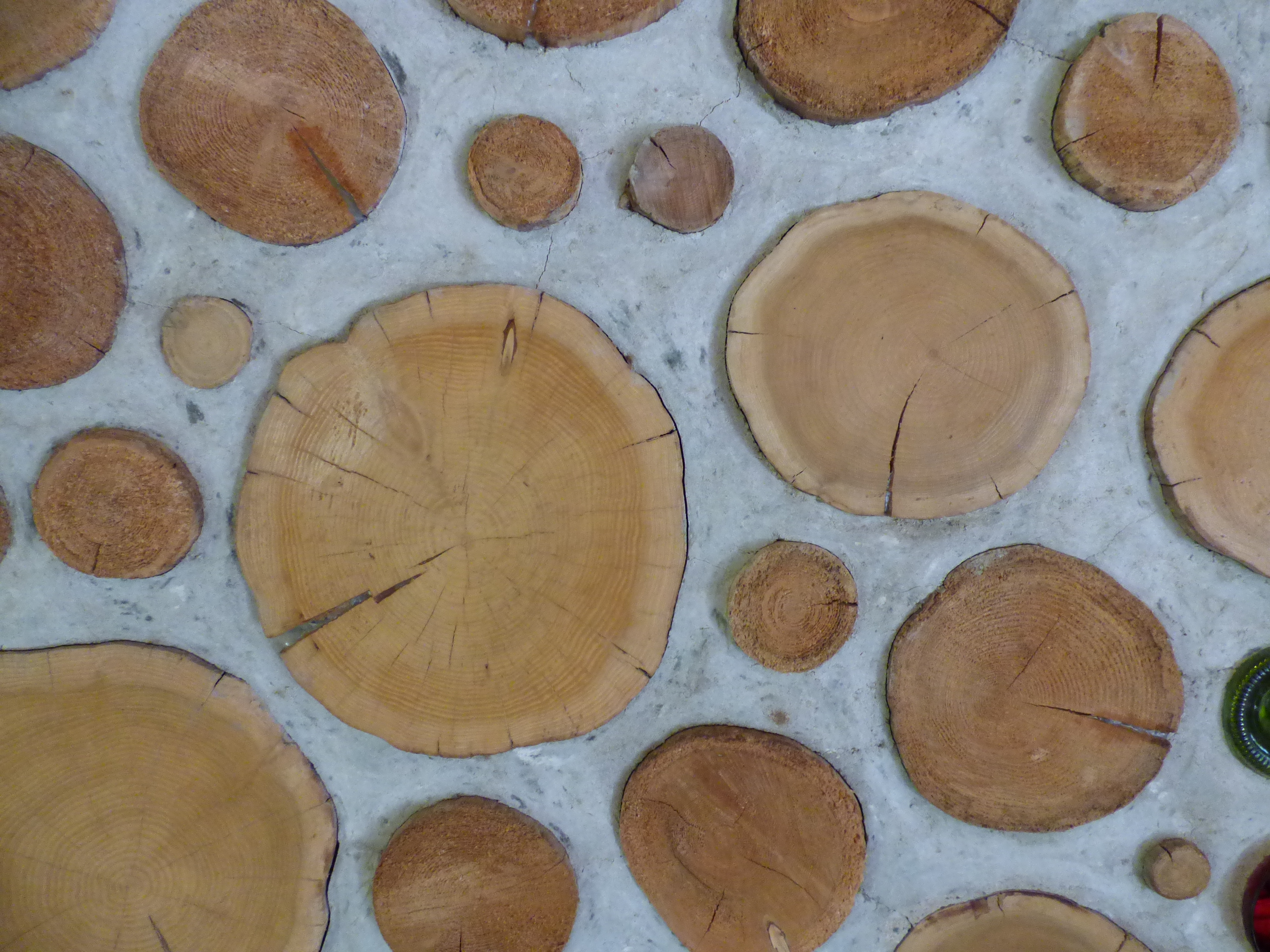
Cordwood masonry wall detail. The method is sometimes called stackwall because the effect resembles a stack of cordwood.

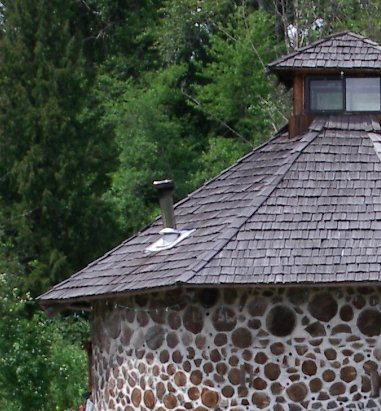
A section of a cordwood home

Cordwood construction (also called cordwood masonry or cordwood building, alternatively stackwall or stovewood particularly in Canada) is a term used for a natural building method in which short logs are piled crosswise to build a wall, using mortar or cob to permanently secure them. This technique can be made to use a wide variety of locally available materials at minimal financial cost, and is a classic example of trading a higher raw labor requirement for technical ease and cost-efficiency of building (a common feature in back-to-the-land alternative/traditional building methods).

== Construction ==
Walls are usually constructed so that the log ends protrude from the mortar by a small amount (an inch or less). Walls typically range between 8 and 24 inches thick, though in northern Canada, some walls are as much as 36 inches thick.

Cordwood homes are attractive for their visual appeal, economy of resources, and ease of construction. Wood usually accounts for about 40-60% of the wall system, the remaining portion consisting of a mortar mix and insulating fill. Cordwood construction can be sustainable depending on design and process. There are two main types of cordwood construction, throughwall and M-I-M (mortar-insulation-mortar). In throughwall, the mortar mix itself contains an insulative material, usually sawdust, chopped newsprint, or paper sludge, in sometimes very high percentages by mass (80% paper sludge/20% mortar). In the more common M-I-M, and unlike brick or throughwall masonry, the mortar does not continue throughout the wall. Instead, three- or four-inch (sometimes more) beads of mortar on each side of the wall provide stability and support, with a separate insulation between them. Cordwood walls can be load-bearing (using built-up corners, or curved wall designed) or laid within a post and beam framework which provides structural reinforcement and is suitable for earthquake-prone areas. As a load-bearing wall, the compressive strength of wood and mortar allows for roofing to be tied directly into the wall. Different mortar mixtures and insulation fill material both affect the wall's overall R value, or resistance to heat flow; and conversely, to its inherent thermal mass, or heat/cool storage capacity.

== History ==
Remains of cordwood structures still standing date back as far as one thousand years in eastern Germany. However, more contemporary versions could be found in Europe, Asia, and the Americas. There is no detailed information about the origins of cordwood construction. However, it is plausible that forest dwellers eventually erected a basic shelter between a fire and a stacked wood pile. In the work of William Tischler of University of Wisconsin, he states that "current" cordwood probably started in the late 1800s in Quebec, Wisconsin, and Sweden. He believes that the technique started in these areas around the same time.

== Wood ==
Cordwood construction is an economical use of log ends or fallen trees in heavily timbered areas. Other common sources for wood include sawmills, split firewood, utility poles (without creosote), split rail fence posts, and logging slash. It is more sustainable and often economical to use recycled materials for the walls. Regardless of the source, all wood must be debarked before the construction begins. While many different types of wood can be used, the most desirable rot resistant woods are Pacific yew, bald cypress (new growth), cedars, and juniper. Acceptable woods also include Douglas fir, western larch, Eastern White Pine, and Spruce Pine.

Less dense and more airy woods are superior because they shrink and expand in lower proportions than dense hardwoods. Most wood can be used in a wall if it is dried properly and stabilized to the external climate's relative humidity. Furthermore, while log ends of different species can be mixed in a wall, log-ends of identical species and source limit expansion/contraction variables.

== Mortar ==
Various experts advise different recipes for mortar mix. One recipe which has proven to be successful since 1981 is 9 parts sand, 3 sawdust, 3 builder's lime (non-agricultural), 2 Portland cement by volume. Builder's lime makes the wall more flexible, breathable, and self-healing because it takes longer to completely set than cement. Portland cement chemically binds the mortar and should be either Type I or II. Another recipe uses 3 parts sand, 2 soaked sawdust, 1 Portland Cement and 1 Hydrated Lime; intended to have the advantage of curing slower and displaying less cracking.

== Thermal mass and insulation ==
Depending on a variety of factors (wall thickness, type of wood, particular mortar recipe), the insulative value of a cordwood wall, as expressed in R-value is generally less than that of a high-efficiency stud wall. Cordwood walls have greater thermal mass than stud frame but less than common brick and mortar. This is because the specific heat capacity of clay brick is higher (0.84 versus wood's 0.42), and is denser than airy woods like cedar, cypress, or pine. However, the insulated mortar matrix utilized in most cordwood walls places useful thermal mass on both sides of the insulated internal cavity, helping to store heat in winter and warm slowly in summer. Thermal mass makes it easier for a building to maintain median interior temperatures while going through daily hot and cold phases. In climates like the desert with broad daily temperature swings thermal mass will absorb and then slowly release the midday heat and nighttime cool in sequence, moderating temperature fluctuations. Thermal mass does not replace the function of insulation material, but is used in conjunction with it.

The longer the logs (and thicker the wall), the better the insulation qualities. A common 16” cordwood wall for moderate climates comprises 6 inches (150 mm) of perlite or vermiculite insulation between mortar joints. Another insulation option, used for over 40 years by Rob Roy and other cordwood builders is dry sawdust, passed through a half-inch screen, and treated with builder's (Type S) lime at the ratio of 12 parts sawdust to 1 part lime. With light airy sawdusts, this insulation is similar in its R-value to manufactured loose-fill insulations, at a fraction of the cost.

However, wood is an anisotropic material with respect to heat flow. That means its thermal resistance depends on the direction of heat flow relative to the wood grain. While wood has a commonly quoted R-value of about 1.25 per inch (depending on the species and moisture content), that only applies if the heat flow is perpendicular to the grain, such as occurs in common wood-frame construction. With cordwood/stackwall construction, the direction of heat flow is parallel to the grain. For this configuration, the R-value is only about 40% of that perpendicular to the grain. Thus, the actual R-value of wood, when used in cordwood/stackwall construction is closer to about 0.50 per inch.

But the R-value of a cordwood masonry wall must take into consideration both the wooden portion and the insulated mortar portion as a combined system. The only authoritative testing on the R-value of cordwood masonry was conducted by Dr. Kris J. Dick (PE) and Luke Chaput during the winter of 2004–2005, based on thermal sensors placed within a 24-inch thick wall at the University of Manitoba. A paper reporting on their findings appears in Cordwood and the Code: a building permit guide The authors' summary says, in part: "Based on approximately three months of mid-winter temperature data, the wall was determined to have an RSI Value of 6.23 (m²K/W), R-35 for a 24-inch wall system."

A thermal performance analysis in 1998 using “HOT 2000” computer software showed the relationship of domestic wall types and their insulating values. The simulation revealed an R value of 20.5 for the sample cordwood wall. Compare this to the basic 2 x 4 wooden stud wall, and 2 x 6 foam insulated and sheathed wall with R values of 15.8 and 25.7, respectively. Cordwood walls are not the best natural insulators but can be built to thermal efficient standards. The R value of a cordwood wall is directly related to its ratio of wood to mortar and insulation medium. However, R value in cordwood construction is not as significant as it is in stick-frame building due to the high thermal mass which increases a significantly higher "effective R-value.” Builders tailor their design and ratios to the existing climate.

R-value testing was completed at the University of Manitoba in the winter of 2005. The findings compiled by the Engineering Department, found that each inch of cordwood wall (mortar, log end and sawdust/lime insulation yielded an r-value of 1.47).

== Costs ==
A cordwood home can be constructed for significantly less initial out-of-pocket cost than a standard stick-frame house of comparable size, since sometimes labor is done primarily by the owner, or volunteers. Properly built cordwood walls tend to have fewer maintenance needs than standard stick-frame, because there are fewer manufactured components (e.g., fiberglass insulation, nailings, sidings, flashings, etc.). Some maintenance still will be required, as there is wood and concrete exposed to the elements on the exterior side of the wall. A cordwood house that is poorly built without sufficient insulation can result in higher heating costs than a traditional stud-frame house.

The 1997 residential cost data shows an "average" trim level 1,000-2,000 sq ft (190 m^{2}) house costing $64.48-$81.76 per sq. ft. Both the acquisition of materials and source of labor play major roles in the initial cost of building a cordwood house.

== Process ==
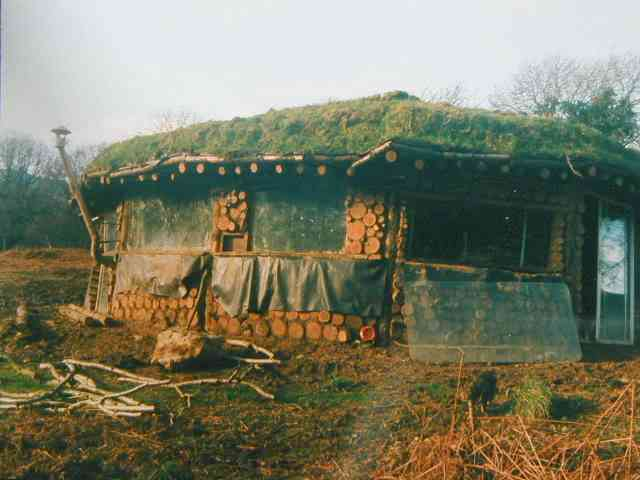
That Roundhouse was built in secret in the Pembrokeshire Coast National Park. The builders cut the timber themselves from the surrounding woods.

In certain jurisdictions construction plans are subject to the building inspector's approval. Before building, soil conditions on the site must be verified to support heavy cordwood masonry walls.

With felled timber, bark should be removed in the spring with a shovel, chisel, or bark spud. The sap is still running in spring time and provides a lubricating layer of cambium between the bark and wood, making separation an easier task than if left until the fall when the two layers are well-bonded together. Once debarked, the logs should sit to dry for at least three summers to limit splitting and checking. It is important to cut the logs, once debarked to the chosen building length. Richard Flatau, Cordwood Construction: Best Practices (2012) suggest splitting 70% of the wood for better drying and seasoning.

After drying, the logs must be cut to the desired length (usually 8, 12, 16, 18, or 24 in.). In this case a metal handsaw is preferable to a chainsaw because its finer cut helps to ward moisture and pest penetration. Actually a "cut off " saw or "buzz saw" will make quick work of cutting cordwood into chosen lengths. For especially furry ends like on cedar, rasps can be used for smoothing.

The wood then needs to be transported to the building site. It is convenient to have the source of cordwood and construction site nearby. Once a proper foundation has been poured which rises 12-24 inches above ground level with a splash guard, construction of the walls can begin. Temporary shelters can be used to cover the worksite and cordwood from rain. A post and beam frame supplies this shelter for subsequent cordwood mortaring.

Inexperienced homebuilders should experiment with a number of practice walls. This will ultimately expedite the building process and provide more satisfying results. When experimenting with M-I-M, (the more common form), two parallel 3 to 4 inch beads of mortar are laid down along the foundation, followed by a middle filling of insulation material. Then logs are laid on top with consistent mortar gaps, protruding no more than 1 inch on the inside and outside of the wall. Actual placement will depend on the size and shapes of the logs. Another layer of mortar is spread, then insulation poured in between, more logs follow and so on. When experimenting with Throughwall, a thin, even layer of insulative mortar is laid along the foundation, then the logs are seated firmly in the mortar bed, in an even fashion, leaving only enough space between them to "point" the mortar. The mortar gaps are filled to make a relatively flat top surface, then another thin layer of mortar is added and the process repeats.

Rob and Jaki Roy, co-directors of Earthwood Building School in West Chazy, New York for 36 years, take a different point of view. They used to use mostly split wood, but now use mostly white cedar (or equal) rounds. The shrinkage is exactly the same in splits and rounds, and the Roys have found the wood easier to lay up because it more readily holds its shape from one side of the wall to the other. Further, the rounds are easier to point, because of the ragged edge that results on the bottom side of a split log. Finally, the greater amount of mortar using rounds is actually a plus because the mortared portion of the wall performs better, thermally, than the wooden portion.

If constructing a house with corners, each course of cordwood should be cross hatched for strength. Near the end, small filler slats of wood may be required to finish the joining or tops of walls. Windows and doors are framed with standard window boxes and wooden lintels. Glass bottles can be inserted for a creative stained glass effect. (Plumbing and electrical wiring are issues to consider but will not be elaborated on in this article).

A cordwood house should have deep overhanging eaves of at least 12- 16 inches to keep the log ends dry and prevent fungal growth. If the ends are maintained to be dry and well aerated, they will age without problem. Some owners have coated their ends with linseed oil, or set the outside log ends flush with the mortar for further weatherproofing. Over time, some checking is normal, and can be remedied with periodic mortar or caulking maintenance.

== Sustainability ==
Although cordwood homes have been tested in -40F locations like Alberta, their thermal efficiency in any climate is below that of a purely cob house of comparable dimensions. In frigid areas it is appropriate to either build a thicker 24-36 inch wall, or two separate super insulated walls. In predominantly wet areas, the outside walls can be plastered, smothering the cordwood ends from air and moisture, but this hides cordwood's attractive log ends and the logs will rot. The quantity of labor relative to gaining a specific R value for cordwood is higher when compared to straw bale and stick frame construction. Funds saved in construction may need to be allocated for heating costs or longterm exterior maintenance. An organic, mortar-like cob creates less of an environmental impact because of the use of readily available mud and straw, whereas toxins emitted during the production of Portland cement are very harmful, albeit less tangible in the final product. Like many alternative building styles, the sustainability of cordwood construction is dependent upon materials and construction variables.

Following the Cordwood Conference in 2005 at Merrill, Wisconsin, a document was published to address best practices in cordwood construction and building code compliance. The document entitled Cordwood and the Code: A Building Permit Guide assists cordwood builders get the necessary code permits.

== See also ==
- Building construction
- Cob (material)
- Wintergreen Studios
