= Truth window =

Opening in a wall surface to reveal the wall components

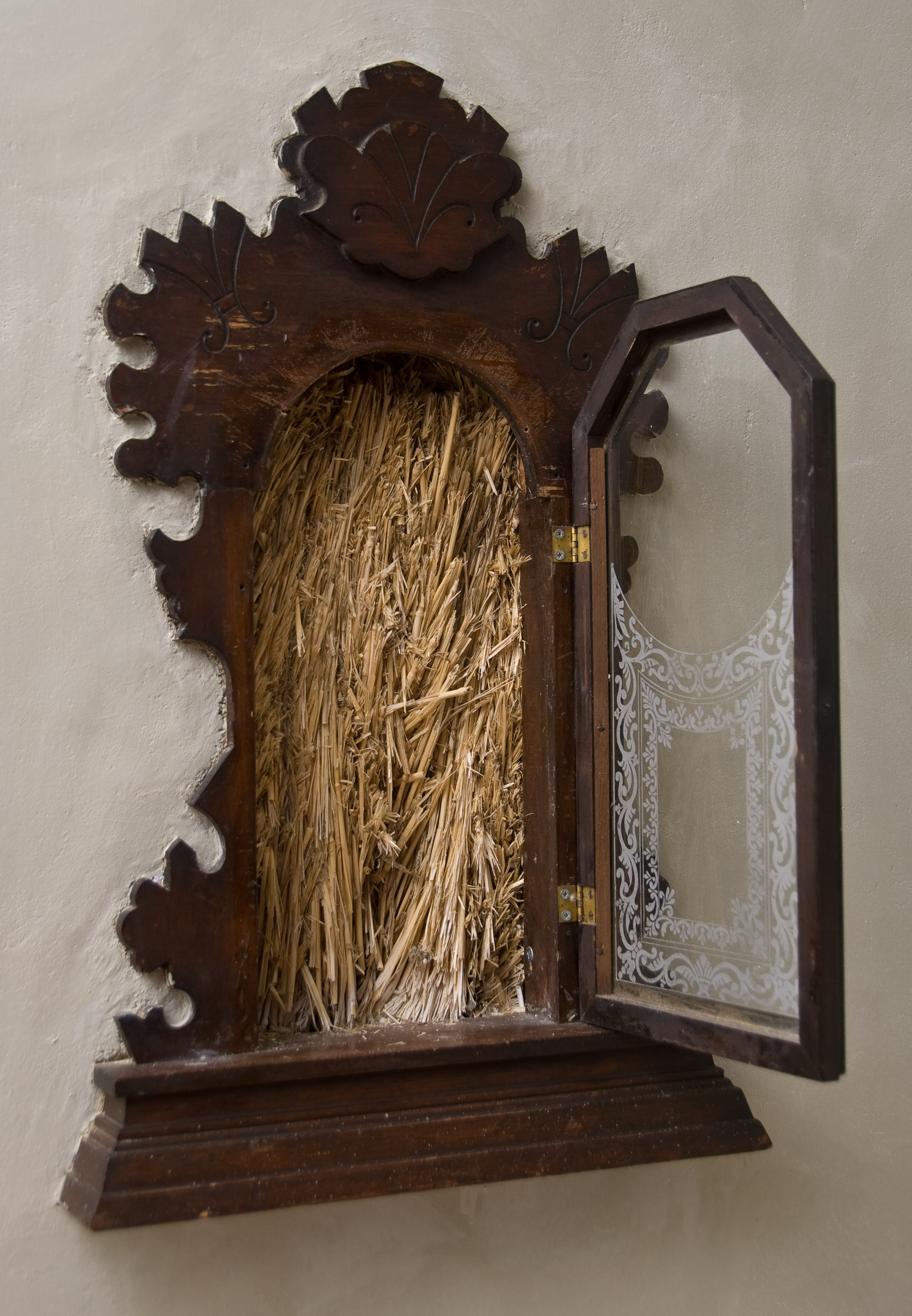
A truth window in a strawbale house

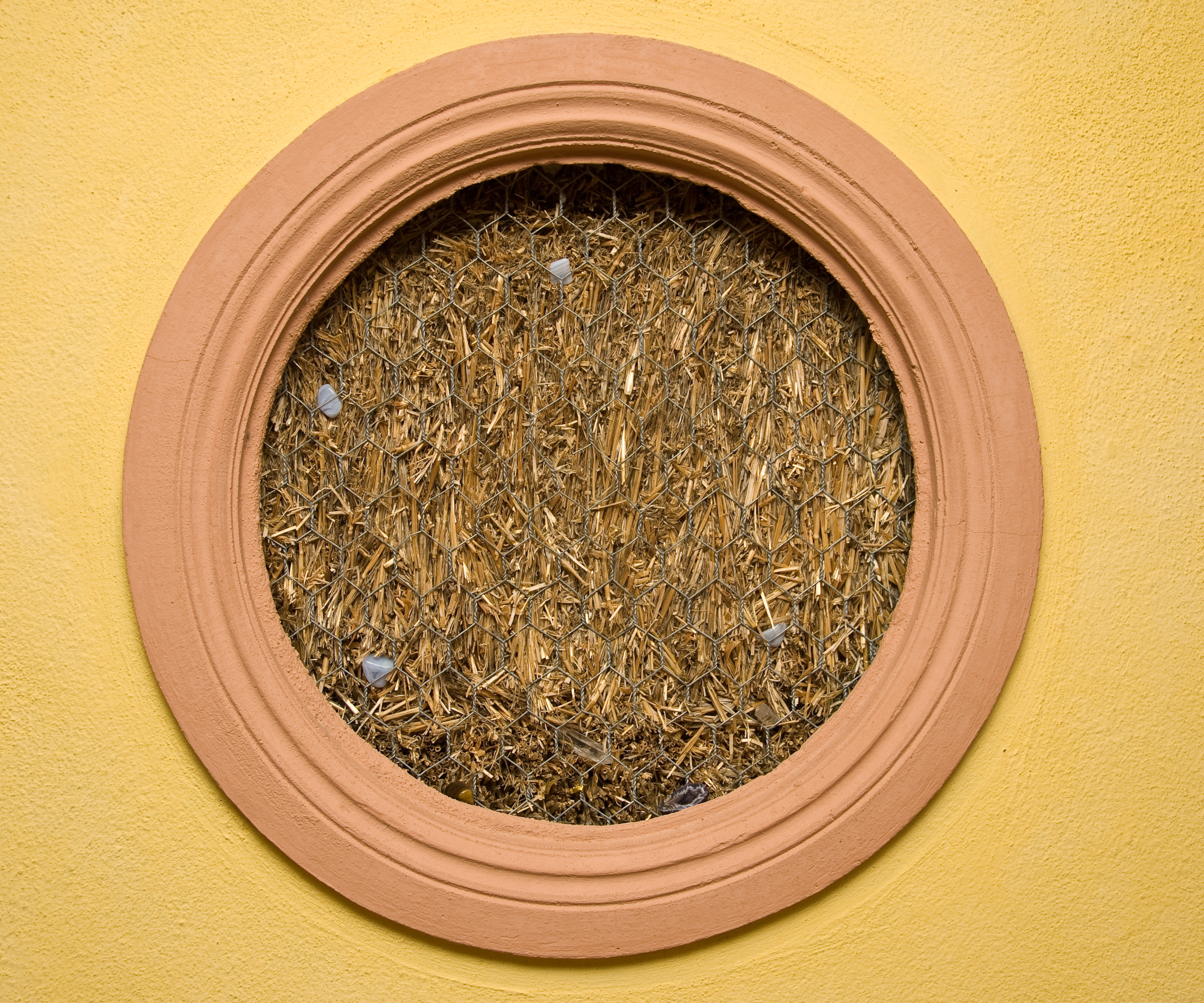
A truth window with no covering

A truth window (or truth wall) is an opening in a wall surface, created to reveal the layers or components within the wall. In a strawbale house, a truth window is often used to show the walls are actually made from straw bales. A small section of a wall is left unplastered on the interior, and a frame is used to create a window which shows only straw, which makes up the inside of the wall.

Many designs exist for truth windows. Glass may be placed over the window, or an openable wooden panel, or it may be a simple framed opening.

The possible vulnerability of a truth window to moisture intrusion is sometimes raised as a concern.

== See also ==
- Straw-bale construction
