= Arthur, Nebraska =

Village in Nebraska, US

- Village
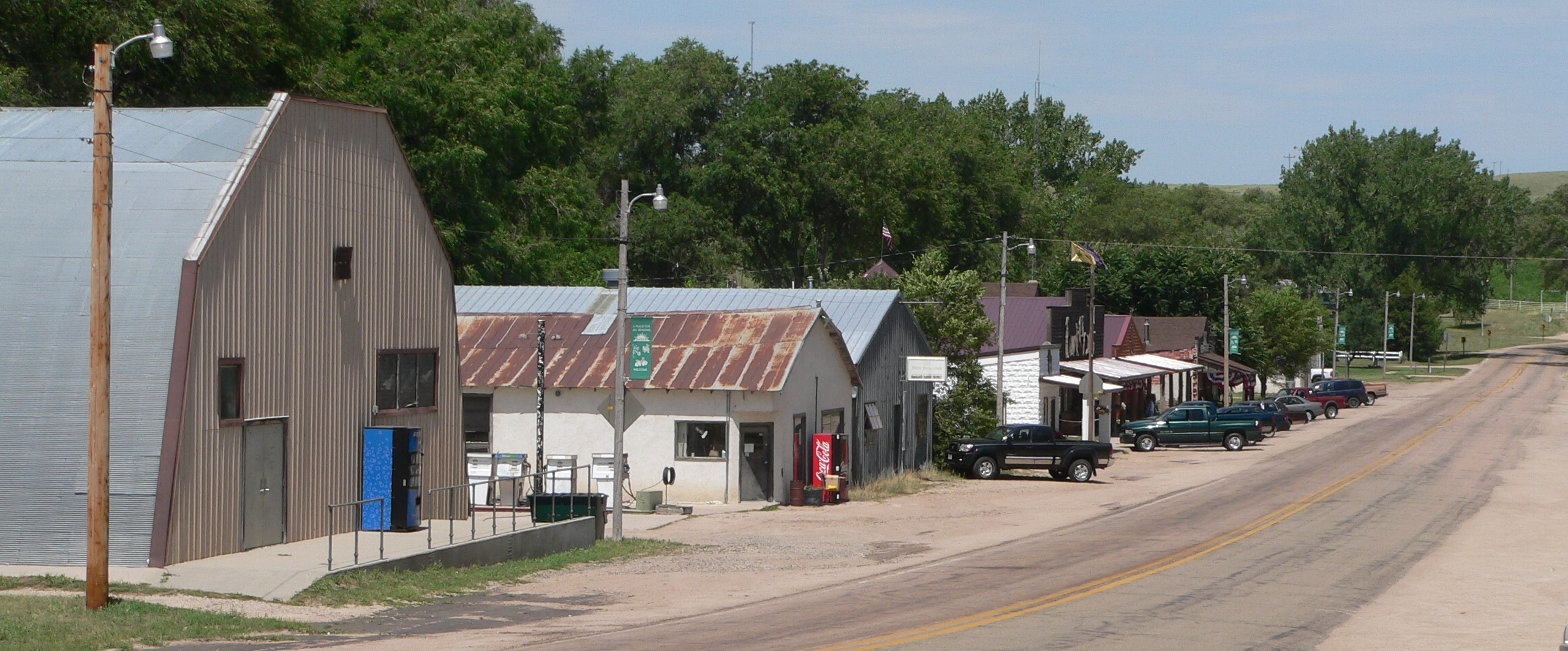
- Downtown Arthur

- Location of Arthur, Nebraska

- Location in the United States
- Coordinates: 41°34′19″N 101°41′32″W
- Country: United States
- State: Nebraska
- County: Arthur

Area
  - Total: 0.31 sq mi (0.80 km^{2})
  - Land: 0.31 sq mi (0.80 km^{2})
  - Water: 0 sq mi (0.00 km^{2})
- Elevation: 3,642 ft (1,110 m)

Population (2020)
  - Total: 128
  - Density: 413/sq mi (159.3/km^{2})
- Time zone: UTC-07:00 (MST)
  - Summer (DST): UTC-06:00 (MDT)
- ZIP code: 69121
- Area code: 308
- FIPS code: 31-02200
- GNIS feature ID: 2397994

Arthur is a village in and the county seat of Arthur County, Nebraska, United States. As of the 2020 census, Arthur had a population of 128.

== History ==
Arthur was founded in 1913 to be the seat of Arthur County, then just organizing. The town and county were both named for President Chester A. Arthur. Arthur was incorporated as a village in 1944. The first county office was a covered wagon, with a one-room courthouse being built in 1915. A year before that, in the Spring, a general store was constructed, and afterward a newspaper, the first church and the post office were established. A one-room high school was also built in 1914, expanding to two rooms in 1920. In 1916 the Arthur State Bank was founded. Into the 1920s, Arthur continued to be built. The town got electricity in 1926, though most of the county would not have it until the early 1950s.

Then in 1932, the Great Depression struck Arthur, closing its bank, which was not replaced until 1939 with the Arthur County Co-op Credit Association. Following WWII, in 1950 construction of a new, large and modern high school was completed. A new courthouse was built in 1960-1961. In 1980, the census population was 125.

=== Historic sites ===
Two sites in Arthur are listed in the National Register of Historic Places. The Pilgrim Holiness Church was built in 1928 out of straw bales, in response to the region's dearth of trees or construction sod. The First Arthur County Courthouse and Jail complex was built in 1914-15; the courthouse is billed as the smallest ever built in the United States. Both sites are now maintained by the Arthur County Historical Society.

== Geography ==
According to the United States Census Bureau, the village has a total area of 0.31 square miles (0.80 km^{2}), all land.

=== Climate ===
Arthur has a borderline humid continental climate (Köppen Dfa/Dwa) just wet enough to avoid being classed as a cool semi-arid climate (BSk). Like most of the High Plains, winters vary from frigid due to incursions of Arctic air, to an average of six afternoons between December and February of 60 °F or 15.6 °C or higher during the afternoon due to chinook winds off the Rocky Mountains. In contrast, 18.2 mornings below 0 °F or −17.8 °C can be expected each winter, alongside 176.5 mornings below freezing and 38.6 afternoons that do not top freezing. Snowfall is moderate in winter due to dryness: the median between 1971 and 2000 being 24.0 inches or 0.61 meters and no day having median snow cover over 3 inches or 0.076 meters.

Spring warms up steadily but erratically: although the first afternoon over 70 °F or 21.1 °C can be expected on March 13, the last morning below freezing is not expected until May 14, and the first fall morning below freezing can be expected on September 26, giving a frost-free season of only 134 days. Most precipitation falls as rain from late spring and summer thunderstorms: the wettest month on record is June 2014 with 8.89 inches (225.8 mm) and the wettest calendar year 2009 with 28.56 inches (725.4 mm), whilst the driest year on record has been 1931 with 9.02 inches (229.1 mm). The wettest day on record has been September 4, 1937, with 3.58 inches or 90.9 millimeters. During dry spells when the upper subtropical ridge is pushed northwards, heatwaves and droughts can occur: 113 °F or 45 °C was recorded during the infamous 1936 heat wave, when Arthur averaged 98.6 °F (37.0 °C) as monthly maximum; in contrast, the wet month of July 1958 had an average maximum of only 79.8 °F or 26.6 °C.

Climate data for Arthur, Nebraska (1971–2000; extremes since 1929)
Month	Jan	Feb	Mar	Apr	May	Jun	Jul	Aug	Sep	Oct	Nov	Dec	Year
Record high °F (°C)	72 (22)	78 (26)	86 (30)	93 (34)	99 (37)	105 (41)	113 (45)	109 (43)	105 (41)	91 (33)	80 (27)	75 (24)	113 (45)
Mean daily maximum °F (°C)	35.0 (1.7)	41.2 (5.1)	49.2 (9.6)	59.4 (15.2)	69.3 (20.7)	79.8 (26.6)	86.6 (30.3)	84.8 (29.3)	75.6 (24.2)	63.4 (17.4)	46.6 (8.1)	37.8 (3.2)	60.7 (15.9)
Daily mean °F (°C)	23.1 (−4.9)	28.8 (−1.8)	36.7 (2.6)	46.8 (8.2)	57.2 (14.0)	67.1 (19.5)	73.3 (22.9)	71.5 (21.9)	61.6 (16.4)	48.8 (9.3)	34.3 (1.3)	25.7 (−3.5)	47.9 (8.8)
Mean daily minimum °F (°C)	11.2 (−11.6)	16.4 (−8.7)	24.1 (−4.4)	34.1 (1.2)	45.1 (7.3)	54.3 (12.4)	59.9 (15.5)	58.1 (14.5)	47.5 (8.6)	34.1 (1.2)	21.9 (−5.6)	13.6 (−10.2)	35.0 (1.7)
Record low °F (°C)	−35 (−37)	−30 (−34)	−28 (−33)	−9 (−23)	14 (−10)	29 (−2)	37 (3)	35 (2)	14 (−10)	−1 (−18)	−19 (−28)	−33 (−36)	−35 (−37)
Average precipitation inches (mm)	0.34 (8.6)	0.40 (10)	1.16 (29)	1.87 (47)	3.34 (85)	2.66 (68)	3.16 (80)	1.84 (47)	1.71 (43)	1.12 (28)	0.69 (18)	0.36 (9.1)	18.65 (472.7)
Average snowfall inches (cm)	5.3 (13)	4.8 (12)	8.0 (20)	3.9 (9.9)	0.3 (0.76)	0.0 (0.0)	0.0 (0.0)	0.0 (0.0)	0.4 (1.0)	1.0 (2.5)	5.2 (13)	4.8 (12)	33.7 (84.16)
Average precipitation days (≥ 0.01 inch)	2.5	2.6	4.5	5.8	8.5	8.2	7.5	6.2	5.5	3.8	3.0	2.5	60.6
Average snowy days (≥ 0.1 inch)	2.5	2.3	3.3	1.6	trace	0.0	0.0	0.0	0.1	0.5	2.0	2.5	14.8
Source 1: National Oceanic and Atmospheric Administration
Source 2: National Weather Service North Platte, Nebraska (extremes)

== Demographics ==
Historical population
Census	Pop.	Note	%±
1950	176		—
1960	165		−6.2%
1970	175		6.1%
1980	124		−29.1%
1990	128		3.2%
2000	145		13.3%
2010	117		−19.3%
2020	128		9.4%
U.S. Decennial Census

=== 2010 census ===
As of the census of 2010, there were 117 people, 61 households, and 35 families residing in the village. The population density was 377.4 inhabitants per square mile (145.7/km^{2}). There were 82 housing units at an average density of 264.5 per square mile (102.1/km^{2}). The racial makeup of the village was 99.1% White and 0.9% Asian.

There were 61 households, of which 23.0% had children under the age of 18 living with them, 42.6% were married couples living together, 13.1% had a female householder with no husband present, 1.6% had a male householder with no wife present, and 42.6% were non-families. 42.6% of all households were made up of individuals, and 23% had someone living alone who was 65 years of age or older. The average household size was 1.92 and the average family size was 2.60.

The median age in the village was 52.5 years. 20.5% of residents were under the age of 18; 3.4% were between the ages of 18 and 24; 13.7% were from 25 to 44; 34.2% were from 45 to 64; and 28.2% were 65 years of age or older. The gender makeup of the village was 51.3% male and 48.7% female.

=== 2000 census ===
As of the census of 2000, there were 145 people, 62 households, and 43 families residing in the village. The population density was 460.5 inhabitants per square mile (177.8/km^{2}). There were 88 housing units at an average density of 279.5 per square mile (107.9/km^{2}). The racial makeup of the village was 97.93% White, 0.69% Native American, 0.69% Asian, 0.69% from other races. Hispanic or Latino of any race were 2.07% of the population.

There were 62 households, out of which 29.0% had children under the age of 18 living with them, 53.2% were married couples living together, 12.9% had a female householder with no husband present, and 30.6% were non-families. 27.4% of all households were made up of individuals, and 16.1% had someone living alone who was 65 years of age or older. The average household size was 2.34 and the average family size was 2.84.

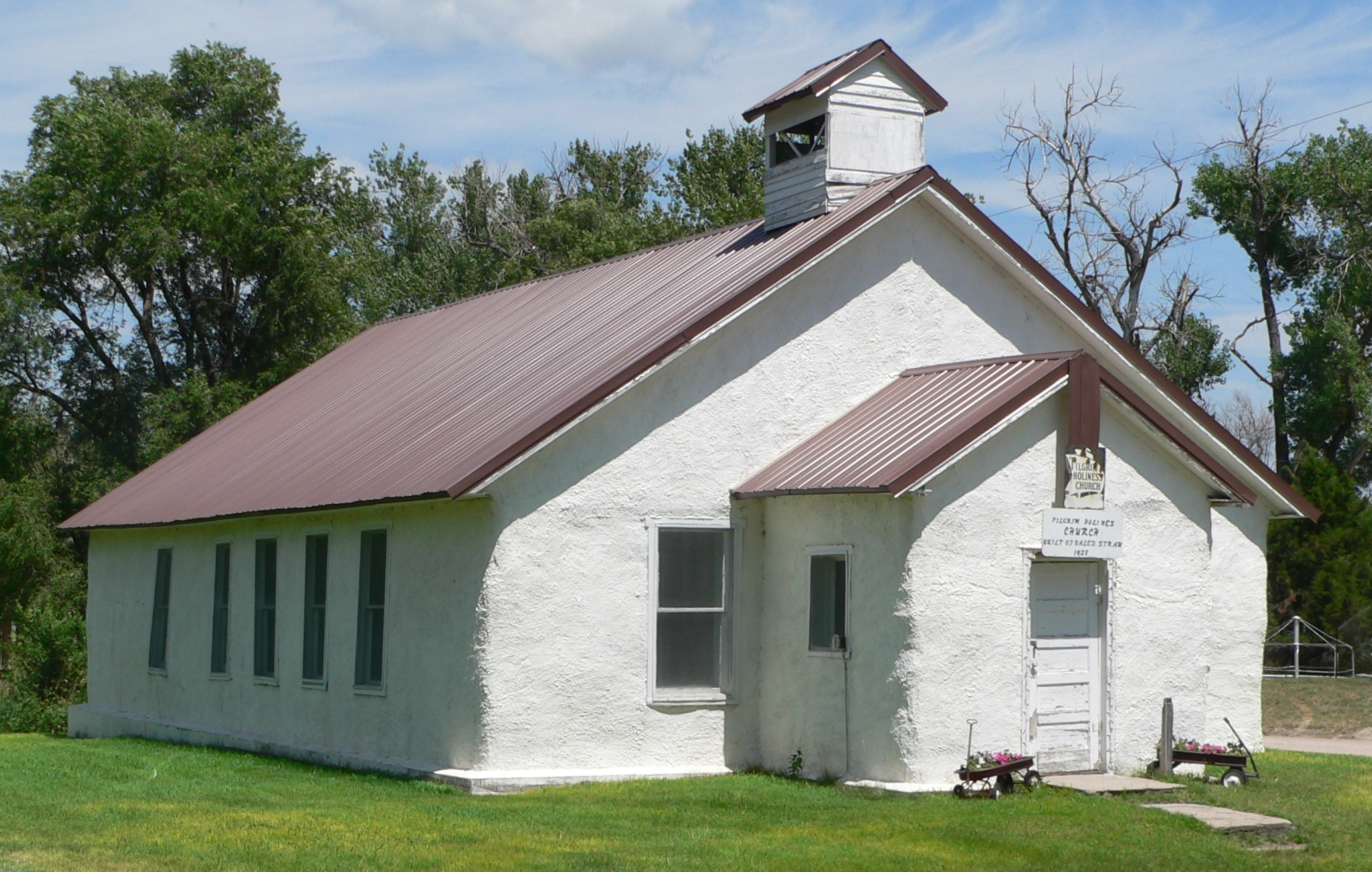
Pilgrim Holiness Church

In the village, the population was spread out, with 25.5% under the age of 18, 2.8% from 18 to 24, 31.0% from 25 to 44, 23.4% from 45 to 64, and 17.2% who were 65 years of age or older. The median age was 41 years. For every 100 females, there were 79.0 males. For every 100 females age 18 and over, there were 86.2 males.

The median income for a household in the village was $24,821, and the median income for a family was $31,458. Males had a median income of $25,417 versus $15,625 for females. The per capita income for the village was $15,196. There were 13.7% of families and 18.4% of the population living below the poverty line, including 20.8% of under eighteens and none of those over 64.

== Transportation ==
The Arthur Municipal Airport is located about one mile (about a kilometer and a half) southwest of Arthur's central business district. The runways are unpaved. The airport handles about 25 operations per year.
