= Bucktail, Nebraska =

Unincorporated community in Nebraska, United States

- Unincorporated Community
- Location within Nebraska Location within the United States
- Coordinates: 41.565°N 101.43°W
- Country: United States
- State: Nebraska
- County: Arthur

Bucktail is an unincorporated community in Arthur County, Nebraska, United States. Its elevation is 3,497 feet (1,066 m), and it is located at 41°33′54″N 101°25′50″W (41.5649908, -101.43044877).
