= Wintergreen Studios =

Wintergreen Studios is an environmental education and wilderness center located in South Frontenac, Ontario, Canada. Established in 2007, Wintergreen's programs focus on “culture, education, and the environment ”, as well as “corporate mindful living”

Wintergreen Studios is a charity and non-profit organization, that receives funding from individual donors and grants. Additional funding comes from program fees, facility rental fees, and the sale of books from Wintergreen Studios Press. Their partners include Queen's University, Pathways to Education, Sustainable Eastern Ontario, and the Wintergreen Renewable Energy Co-operative. Wintergreen relies on a voluntary team to maintain the facility and assist with program delivery.

== History ==
In 1990, Rena Upitis, Professor of Education and former Dean of Education at Queen's University, purchased a 204-acre property in South Frontenac, Ontario. The land was previously farmed by Irish settler Patrick Nolan.

In the summer of 2006, Upitis learned to build with natural and re-purposed materials at the Earthwood Building School in West Chazy, New York. Upon her return, she built the first cordwood guest cabin on the property, called the Hobbit House.

In 2007, Wintergreen's property became part of the Frontenac Arch Biosphere Reserve (a UNESCO designation), due in part to its ecological significance as a land bridge between the Canadian Shield and the Adirondack Mountains.

In April of that year, Upitis attended a conference in Chicago, where she observed numerous skyscrapers and a scarcity of natural spaces. She then decided to create a year-round facility aimed at restoring balance to the land and the lives of its inhabitants.

One week later in spring 2007, Upitis chose the name "Wintergreen" for the facility; a nod to the plant that grew on the South Frontenac property. She began sourcing local straw for sustainable building construction and assembled an initial board of directors. These directors were Rena Upitis, Serena Manson, Ann Patteson, Helen Turnbull, and Katherine Smithrim. In September 2007, Wintergreen Studios was incorporated as a not-for-profit organization by the five directors. In July 2008, Wintergreen was granted charitable status.

In summer 2008, construction of the main facility, known as the Lodge began. Many of the builders were volunteers, including Anglin Group Ltd and Camel's Back Construction. Two smaller storage buildings called the Smoke House and the Root Cellar were also built during this time. By December 2008, all three structures were complete and the first programs were offered at Wintergreen.

In 2009, a Sauna was built on the property using the same cordwood design present in other buildings on the property.

In 2010, a guest cabin called the Meadow Hut was constructed, followed by a Bake Oven next to the Smoke House.

By 2012, there were six structures on the land built from cordwood. In the summer of 2012, the first cabin using a combination of straw bale and cordwood was built during a course at Wintergreen, known as the Beach House.

By 2013, at a site 15 minutes away from Wintergreen, Upitis and a team of volunteers built a cordwood writer's cabin called the Hermit Hut.

In 2017, Wintergreen Studios celebrated its 10-year anniversary. To mark the achievement, they built a labyrinth.

In 2019, an apiary was built south of the lodge.

== Facility ==
=== Environmentally friendly structures ===
Wintergreen Studios consists of nine self proclaimed environmentally friendly structures spread around the property, and an unspecified number of structures otherwise. Of the environmentally friendly structures, there are four guest cabins, the Smoke House, the Root Cellar, the Sauna, the Bake Oven, and the Lodge. The structures are primarily made of materials such as stone, wood, or soil. They also have re-purposed materials like discarded copper roofing, fence posts, broken pottery, glass, cedar fence rails, and plants from the surrounding meadows.

==== Lodge ====
The Lodge is primarily made of straw-bales and cordwood. A 3 KW solar voltaic array and solar hot water heater make use of southern light and the building features, including R-40 insulation, clerestory windows, and considerable thermal mass from the plastered walls and concrete foundation. One wing is sheltered with a living roof. Recycled barn beams are also featured in the design. A peat-based septic system is used for sewage treatment and management. Surrounding the lodge is a native wildflower garden to the south and a vegetable and herb garden to the north. Food grown in this garden is served to guests at Wintergreen.

The Lodge interior includes a commercial kitchen, dining area, 6 bedrooms, and 3 bathrooms. The Lodge is the main site for concerts, educational workshops, and other events hosted by Wintergreen, as well as smaller private gatherings. The space can accommodate up to 50 people, with room for 16 overnight guests.

==== Cabins ====
The four guest cabins are the Meadow Hut, the Beach House, the Parthenon, and the Hobbit House. The Beach House and Meadow Hut are a short walk from the Lodge. The Parthenon and the Hobbit House are a 20–30 minute walk from the Lodge, near a semi-private lake. Each cabin has a wood stove, a futon or bed, and a writing table. There is no electricity or running water in the cabins.

=== Other built features ===
A Camping Meadow sits just west of the lodge. The area has a camping site for overnight guests and an outdoor location able to contain large events. It features several wooden tent pads, a fire pit, an outhouse, and an outdoor kitchen located on the edge of the meadow, near the cordwood Root Cellar.

Wintergreen's Labyrinth is a mowed winding path marked by stones, with a tree in the center. It is located west of the lodge across from the Meadow Hut. The Labyrinth was built by guests at Wintergreen under the guidance of Labyrinth facilitator Drew Strickland. Each season, Wintergreen hosts Labyrinth Walks where guests are guided through a walking meditation experience.

In the spring of 2019, Wintergreen built a bee yard called the '9th Meadow Apiary' with support from Alex Pederson of the Limestone Beekeepers’ Guild. An electric fence surrounds the apiary to keep black bears and other large animals from harming the beehives.

=== Hiking trails ===
According to Wintergreen's trail map, there are 13 marked trails spread throughout the 204-acre property. Notable features along the trails include a beaver dam, an abandoned mica mine (a silicate), wooden bridges, and a large wooden musical instrument hanging in the trees.

=== Natural features ===
Wintergreen Studios is located atop igneous and metamorphic bedrock from the Precambrian period. The land is approximately 600 m above sea level and features forests, meadows, streams, marshes, ponds, and granite outcrops.

According to a soil survey of Frontenac County in 1965, Wintergreen's soil has “no capability for arable culture or permanent pasture”, due in part to the amount of rocky land and bodies of water in the area. The soil is classified as sandy loam and rock.

The forests of Wintergreen are predominately deciduous trees such as maples, oaks, and birch. The understory is thick with shrubs, wildflowers and moss. Birds are commonly sighted and heard in the forest, including black-capped chickadees, blue jays, and red-tailed hawks. Guests have also sighted scarlet tanagers, indigo buntings, American redstarts, and barred owls. Porcupines and black bears are also found in Wintergreen's forests, as well as white-tailed deer. Guests often spot deer scat along the trails and flattened areas of grass where deer rest in the forest. Gray treefrogs can be heard calling from the trees in the spring.

Wintergreen's meadows are found mainly near the Lodge and feature tall grasses with several wildflower species, such as bull thistle and common milkweed. Ruby-throated hummingbirds, smooth green snakes, and goldenrod crab spiders are a few species observed in the meadow. An abundance of insects are also present, including beetles, flies, bees, damselflies, dragonflies, butterflies, and moths.

Wetlands at Wintergreen include Long Pond, Duck Pond, and Paddys Lake. Around the wetlands, common plants such as spotted jewelweed and swamp milkweed are often found. Wildlife sightings in the wetland include American beavers, common loons, and painted turtles, in addition to several frog species such as northern leopard frogs, green frogs, and spring peepers.

== Programs ==
Wintergreen's programs change based on the current season. The programs mainly explore “sustainable and mindful living”, citizen science, and the arts.

=== Sustainable and mindful living ===
- Beekeeping: Participants learn how to care for pollinators and manage an apiary as part of Wintergreen's Project Bee.
- Pre-Service Teacher Training: Teachers-in-training at Queen's University are taught sustainable habits and can complete their alternative practicum at Wintergreen.
- Labyrinth Walks and Other Seasonal Walks: Mindful walking and meditation practices on the grounds of Wintergreen.
- Wellness Workshops: Topics range from death and grieving to forest therapy.
- Cooking and Tasting: Locally sourced meals are prepared and served at Wintergreen.
- Annual Green Energy Community Retreat: A one-day retreat featuring presentations, small group discussions, and Q&A Sessions on the topic of renewable energy.

=== Citizen science ===
- Annual Land Art BioBlitz: Participants identify species and explore their relationship with nature over this 5-day event each spring.

=== Arts ===
- Writing Workshops: Participants receive creative writing guidance from celebrated authors.
- Book Launches: Authors promote their new work at Wintergreen Studios. Past authors include Peter Coffman, Lorrie Jorgensen, and Lorna Crozier.
- Fine Art Workshops: Artists offer instruction on a variety of media.
- Music Workshops: Topics include drumming, drum making, and vocal performance.
- Concerts: Dinner and a live performance. Past performers include Fiddlehead Soup, Triola, Ian Tamblyn, Jesse Stewart and David Mott, Teilhard Frost, and the Orontes Quartet.
- Annual Summer Youth Music Camp: A weekend-long summer camp for the Kingston Youth Choir and young singers aged 12–19.

=== Notable past programs ===
- Buildings for a Changing Climate (2017): A workshop on reducing energy costs and greenhouse gas emissions, lasting one full day.
- A Call for Poets: Writing Retreat (2017): A week-long retreat to help participants find their stories and passion for words. Hosted by Canadian poet Lorna Crozier.
- Electric Vehicle Green Energy Retreat (2018): A one-day retreat to showcase electric vehicles and discuss electric vehicle ownership.

== Wintergreen Studios Press ==
In 2010, Wintergreen Studios created Wintergreen Studios Press, an independent literary press. They are governed by an advisory board and hire contract editors, consultants, and graphic artists when a submission is accepted.

Since 2010, Wintergreen Studios Press has published 17 books, including Writing at Wintergreen: An Anthology (2012) edited by Helen Humphreys, A Life of Learning (2012) by John Meisel, and How the Light is Spent (2013) by Gail Sidonie Sobat. Rena Upitis has also published books under Wintergreen Studios Press, including Raising a School (2010) and Cooking at Wintergreen (2018), co-authored by Monica Capovilla.
