= Arthur County, Nebraska =

County in Nebraska, United States

- County
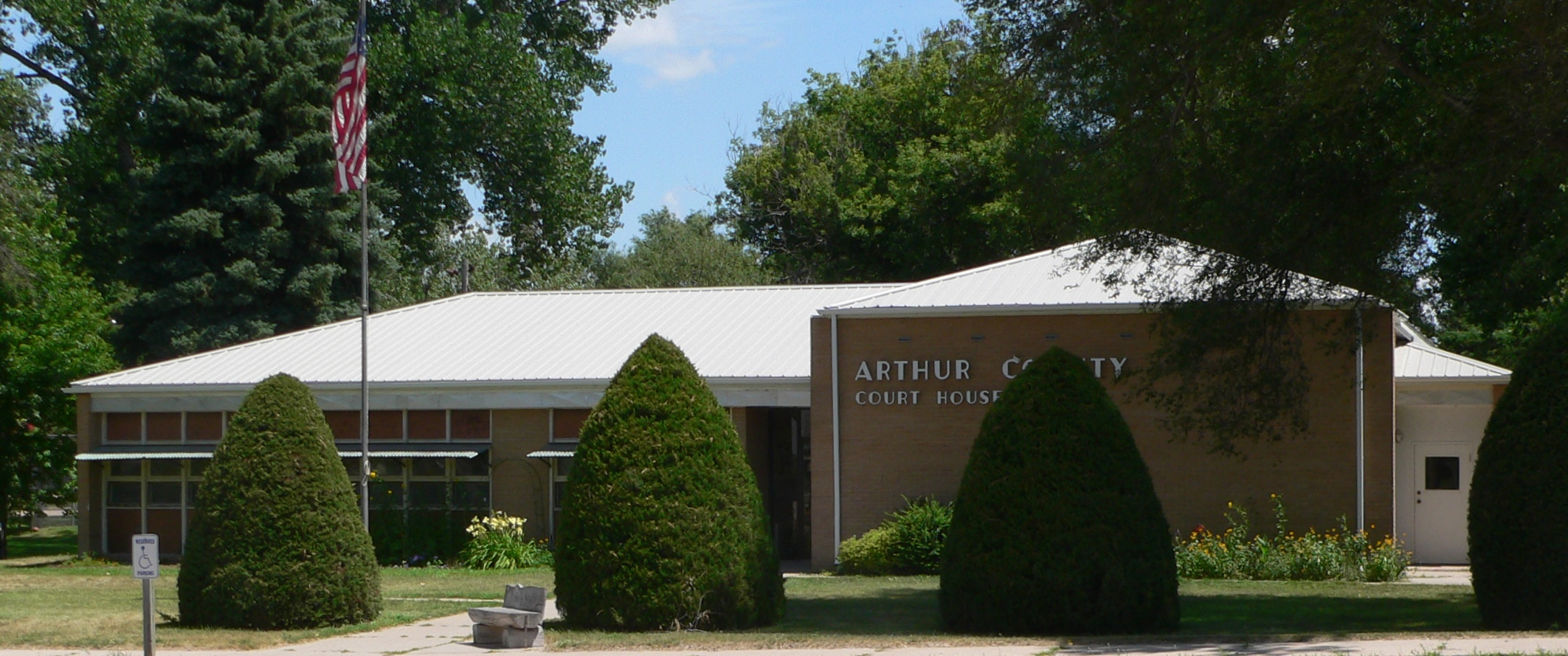
- The Arthur County Courthouse in Arthur

- Location within the U.S. state of Nebraska
- Coordinates: 41.571930°N 101.695917°W
- Country: United States
- State: Nebraska
- Created: March 31, 1887
- Organized: August 16, 1913
- Named for: Chester A. Arthur
- Seat: Arthur
- Largest Community: Arthur

Area
  - Total: 718.104 sq mi (1,859.88 km^{2})
  - Land: 715.152 sq mi (1,852.24 km^{2})
  - Water: 2.952 sq mi (7.65 km^{2}) 0.41%

Population (2020)
  - Total: 434
  - Estimate (2025): 396 ▼
  - Density: 0.607/sq mi (0.234/km^{2})
- Time zone: UTC−7 (Mountain)
  - Summer (DST): UTC−6 (MDT)
- Area code: 308
- Congressional district: 3rd
- Website: arthurcounty.nebraska.gov
- • Nebraska county number 03 • Nebraska license plate prefix 91

Arthur County is a county located in the U.S. state of Nebraska. As of the 2020 census, the population was 434, and was estimated to be 396 in 2025, making it the second-least populous county in Nebraska, and the sixth-least populous county in the United States (behind only Loving County, Texas; Kalawao County, Hawaii; King County, Texas; Kenedy County, Texas; and McPherson County, Nebraska). The county seat and only incorporated community is Arthur.

In the Nebraska license plate system, Arthur County was represented by the prefix "91" (as it had the 91st-largest number of vehicles registered in the state when the license plate system was established in 1922).

Arthur County contains the historic First Arthur County Courthouse and Jail, believed to be the smallest courthouse in the United States.

== History ==
Arthur County was created on March 31, 1887 and organized on August 16, 1913 from the western part of McPherson County following an effort to move the McPherson County seat from Tryon to the more centrally located Flats: rather than lose the county seat, the residents of Tryon, Nebraska agreed to have the county divided approximately in half, according to boundaries for sandhills counties originally proposed in 1887. The half which became Arthur County had been in the process of settlement by 1884, by ranchers seeking open grazing land. The placement of a post office at Lena in 1894 and the passage of the homesteading act in 1904 (which allowed claims of 640 acres compared to the previous 160 acres in this area) further influenced the county's founding and expedited the new county's establishment processes.

The new county was named after President Chester A. Arthur, and the village of Arthur, similarly named, was established to serve as the county seat. Principal postal service moved from Lena to the village of Arthur in 1914, which also held the county's public schools, general store, bank and co-op, principal churches, newspaper and other businesses and services, all aimed at continuing and facilitating the county's rural lifestyle.

The 1920 census counted 1,412 residents in Arthur County, which was then and has remained entirely rural, essentially ranching. Although the village of Arthur underwent electrification in the 1920s, most of the county did not see power or telephone services until 1950–1951. At that time also, highway construction and improvements facilitated transportation, which was especially dependent upon the north-south State Highway 61 and the east-west Highway 92: motor vehicles were the sole means of mechanical transportation throughout Arthur's history as it had no railroad or canal. Irrigation of the sandhills land started by 1900 and continued through the first half of the twentieth century, with center-pivot irrigation dominating. The population peaked around 1930 at 1,344 persons, but declined with the Great Depression. By 1950, the county population was down to 803, by 1980 down to 513.

== Geography ==
According to the United States Census Bureau, the county has a total area of 718.104 square miles (1,859.88 km^{2}), of which 715.152 square miles (1,852.24 km^{2}) is land and 2.952 square miles (7.65 km^{2}) (0.41%) is water. It is the 36th-largest county in Nebraska by total area.

=== Major highways ===
- Nebraska Highway 61
- Nebraska Highway 92

=== Adjacent counties ===
- Grant County – north
- Hooker County – northeast
- McPherson County – east
- Keith County – south
- Garden County – west

== Demographics ==
Historical population
Census	Pop.	Note	%±
1920	1,412		—
1930	1,344		−4.8%
1940	1,045		−22.2%
1950	803		−23.2%
1960	680		−15.3%
1970	606		−10.9%
1980	513		−15.3%
1990	462		−9.9%
2000	444		−3.9%
2010	460		3.6%
2020	434		−5.7%
2025 (est.)	396	▼	−8.8%
U.S. Decennial Census; 1790–1960 1900–1990; 1990–2000 2010–2020

=== 2020 census ===
As of the 2020 census, the county had a population of 434. The median age was 41.5 years. 27.2% of residents were under the age of 18 and 24.0% of residents were 65 years of age or older. For every 100 females there were 95.5 males, and for every 100 females age 18 and over there were 98.7 males age 18 and over.

The racial makeup of the county was 92.2% White, 0.7% Black or African American, 0.0% American Indian and Alaska Native, 0.0% Asian, 0.0% Native Hawaiian and Pacific Islander, 0.0% from some other race, and 7.1% from two or more races. Hispanic or Latino residents of any race comprised 2.8% of the population.

0.0% of residents lived in urban areas, while 100.0% lived in rural areas.

There were 174 households in the county, of which 34.5% had children under the age of 18 living with them and 21.8% had a female householder with no spouse or partner present. About 28.2% of all households were made up of individuals and 16.7% had someone living alone who was 65 years of age or older.

There were 226 housing units, of which 23.0% were vacant. Among occupied housing units, 68.4% were owner-occupied and 31.6% were renter-occupied. The homeowner vacancy rate was 0.0% and the rental vacancy rate was 7.9%.

=== 2000 census ===
As of the 2000 census, there were 444 people, 185 households, and 138 families residing in the county. The population density was 0.618 people per square mile (0.239 people/km^{2}). There were 273 housing units at an average density of 0.380 units per square mile (0.147/km^{2}). The racial makeup of the county was 96.40% White, 0.23% Native American, 0.68% Asian, 0.23% Pacific Islander, 0.90% from other races, and 1.58% from two or more races. 1.35% of the population were Hispanic or Latino of any race. 50.4% were of German, 13.1% English, 6.2% Irish and 5.7% Swedish ancestry.

There were 185 households, out of which 27.60% had children under the age of 18 living with them, 63.20% were married couples living together, 7.60% had a female householder with no husband present, and 25.40% were non-families. 21.60% of all households were made up of individuals, and 10.80% had someone living alone who was 65 years of age or older. The average household size was 2.40 and the average family size was 2.80.

The county population contained 23.90% under the age of 18, 5.40% from 18 to 24, 29.50% from 25 to 44, 24.80% from 45 to 64, and 16.40% who were 65 years of age or older. The median age was 40 years. For every 100 females there were 101.80 males. For every 100 females age 18 and over, there were 107.40 males.

The median income for a household in the county was $27,375, and the median income for a family was $31,979. Males had a median income of $21,544 versus $13,125 for females. The per capita income for the county was $15,810. About 7.90% of families and 13.80% of the population were below the poverty line, including 15.10% of those under age 18 and 7.80% of those age 65 or over.

== Religion ==
More than 50% of the county residents are Baptists, making it the northernmost Baptist majority county in the United States.

== Politics ==
Arthur County has voted strongly for Republican presidential candidates since 1936. Each one since 1952 has gotten over 60% of the vote, with the exception of George H. W. Bush in 1992. 2008 and 2012 are the only 2 elections since 1988 where the Democratic presidential candidate has even gotten a double digit percentage of the county's vote.

Political Party	Number of registered voters (March 1, 2026)	Percent
Republican	291	87.92%
Independent	21	6.34%
Democratic	18	5.44%
Libertarian	1	0.30%
Legal Marijuana Now	0	0.00%
Total	331	100.00%

United States presidential election results for Arthur County, Nebraska
Year	Republican		Democratic		Third party(ies)	
Year	No.	%	No.	%	No.	%
1916	143	32.13%	286	64.27%	16	3.60%
1920	167	57.00%	94	32.08%	32	10.92%
1924	143	34.88%	101	24.63%	166	40.49%
1928	402	69.43%	169	29.19%	8	1.38%
1932	237	39.77%	338	56.71%	21	3.52%
1936	312	56.73%	235	42.73%	3	0.55%
1940	348	64.21%	194	35.79%	0	0.00%
1944	268	63.66%	153	36.34%	0	0.00%
1948	199	57.51%	147	42.49%	0	0.00%
1952	307	83.20%	62	16.80%	0	0.00%
1956	248	78.48%	68	21.52%	0	0.00%
1960	283	80.63%	68	19.37%	0	0.00%
1964	243	65.85%	126	34.15%	0	0.00%
1968	218	77.86%	47	16.79%	15	5.36%
1972	236	83.99%	45	16.01%	0	0.00%
1976	193	73.66%	64	24.43%	5	1.91%
1980	245	76.80%	57	17.87%	17	5.33%
1984	248	88.26%	33	11.74%	0	0.00%
1988	210	78.07%	58	21.56%	1	0.37%
1992	148	56.06%	18	6.82%	98	37.12%
1996	187	72.48%	25	9.69%	46	17.83%
2000	235	86.40%	26	9.56%	11	4.04%
2004	240	90.23%	24	9.02%	2	0.75%
2008	217	82.51%	39	14.83%	7	2.66%
2012	227	86.64%	30	11.45%	5	1.91%
2016	244	89.38%	17	6.23%	12	4.40%
2020	260	91.23%	21	7.37%	4	1.40%
2024	264	93.29%	17	6.01%	2	0.71%

== Communities ==
=== Village ===
- Arthur (county seat)

=== Unincorporated communities ===
- Bucktail
- Calora
- Lena
- Velma

== See also ==
- National Register of Historic Places listings in Arthur County, Nebraska
