= Energy in the United States =

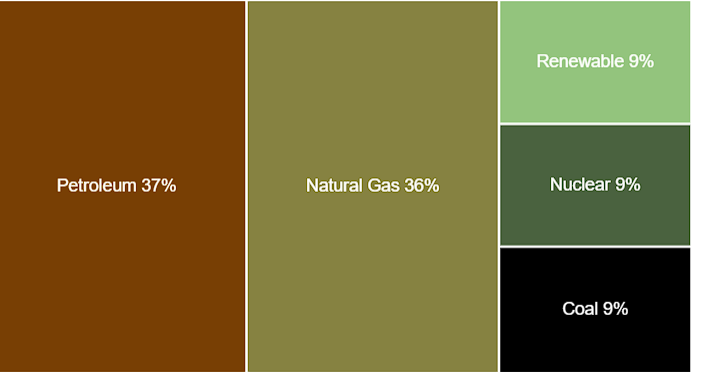
US energy consumption in 2025

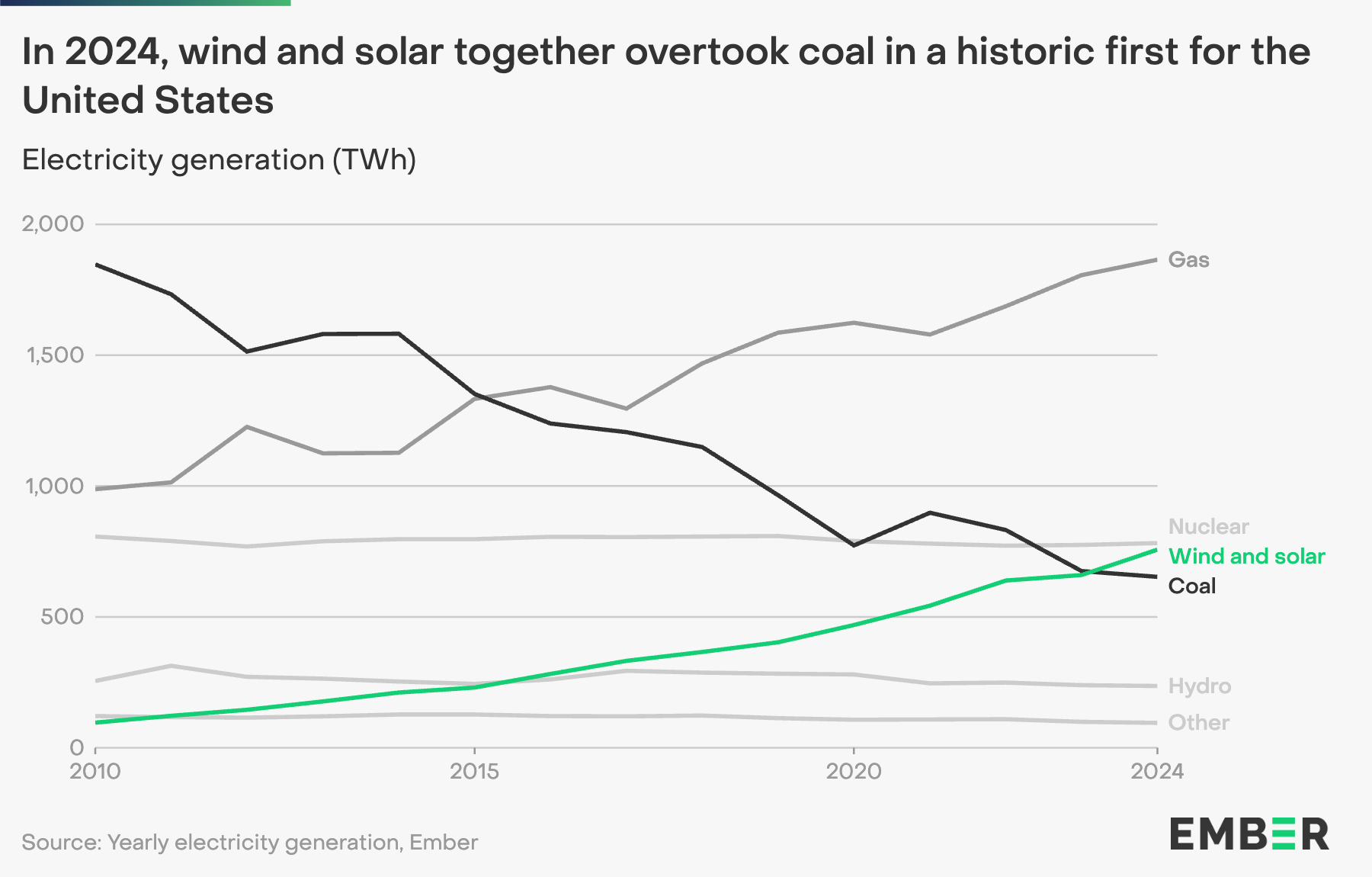
In 2024, wind and solar together overtook coal for the first time in the US. Natural gas remains the largest energy source in the US at 43%.

Energy in the United States is obtained from a variety of sources, although the majority came from fossil fuels in 2025: 37% of the nation's energy originated from petroleum, 36% from natural gas, and 9% from coal. Electricity from nuclear power supplied 9% and renewable energy supplied 9%, which includes biomass, wind, hydro, solar and geothermal. Energy consumption in 2025 was mostly for industry (35%) and transportation (37%), with use in homes (15%) and commercial buildings (13%) making up the remainder. The United States' portion of the electrical grid in North America had a nameplate capacity of 1,281 GW and produced 4,429 TWh in 2025, using 32% of primary energy to do so.

Natural gas overtook coal as the dominant source for electric generation in 2016. Coal was overtaken by nuclear for the first time in 2020 and by renewables in 2023.

Energy figures are measured in BTU, with 1 BTU equal to 1.055 kJ and 1 quadrillion BTU (1 quad) equal to 1.055 EJ. Because BTU is a unit of heat, sources that generate electricity directly are multiplied by a conversion factor to equate them with sources that use a heat engine.

The United States was the second-largest energy producer and consumer in 2024 after China. The United States had a per capita energy consumption of 277 million BTU (292 GJ), ranking it tenth in the world behind Canada, Iceland, and several Arab nations.

== History ==
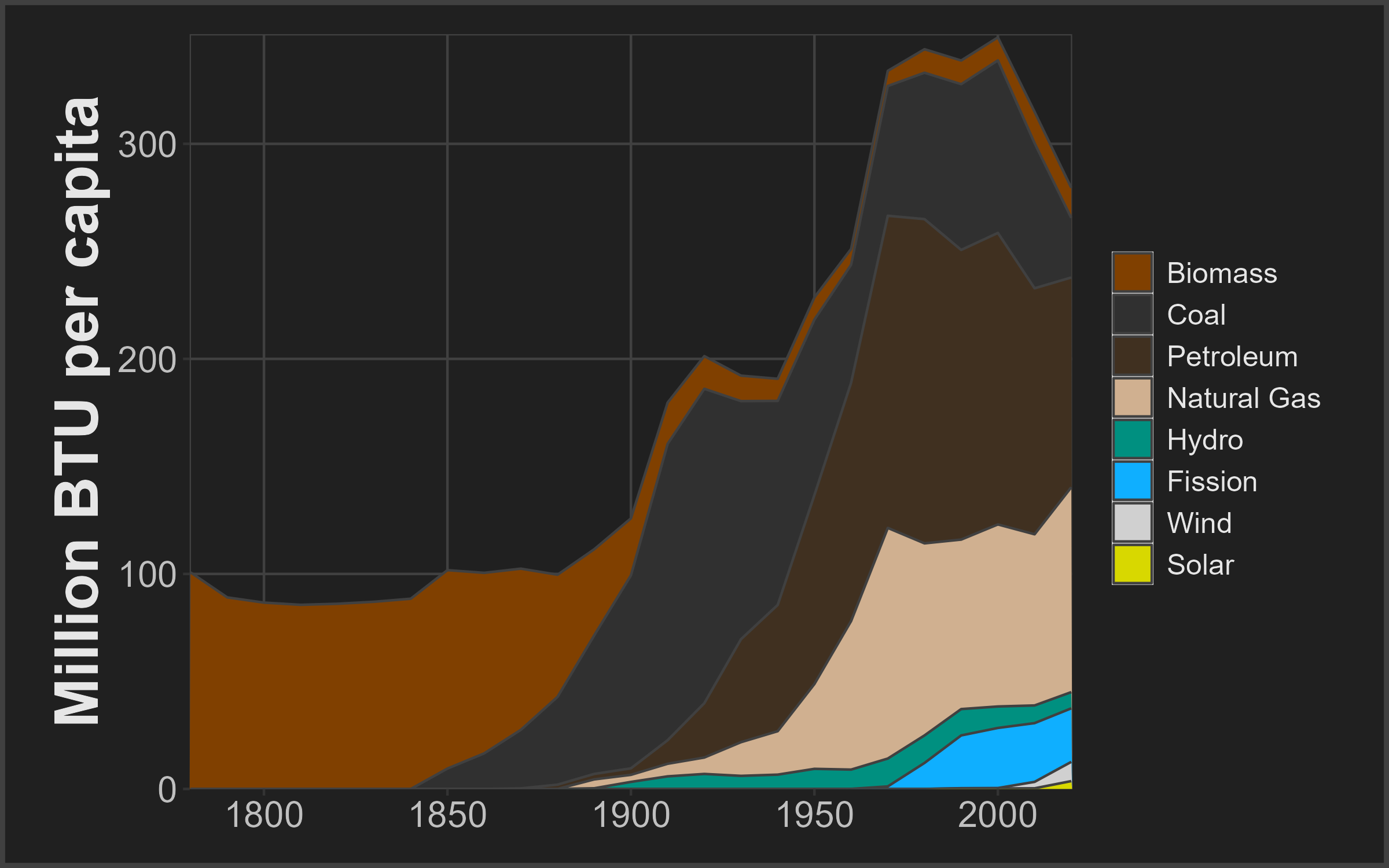
Per capita energy use by source

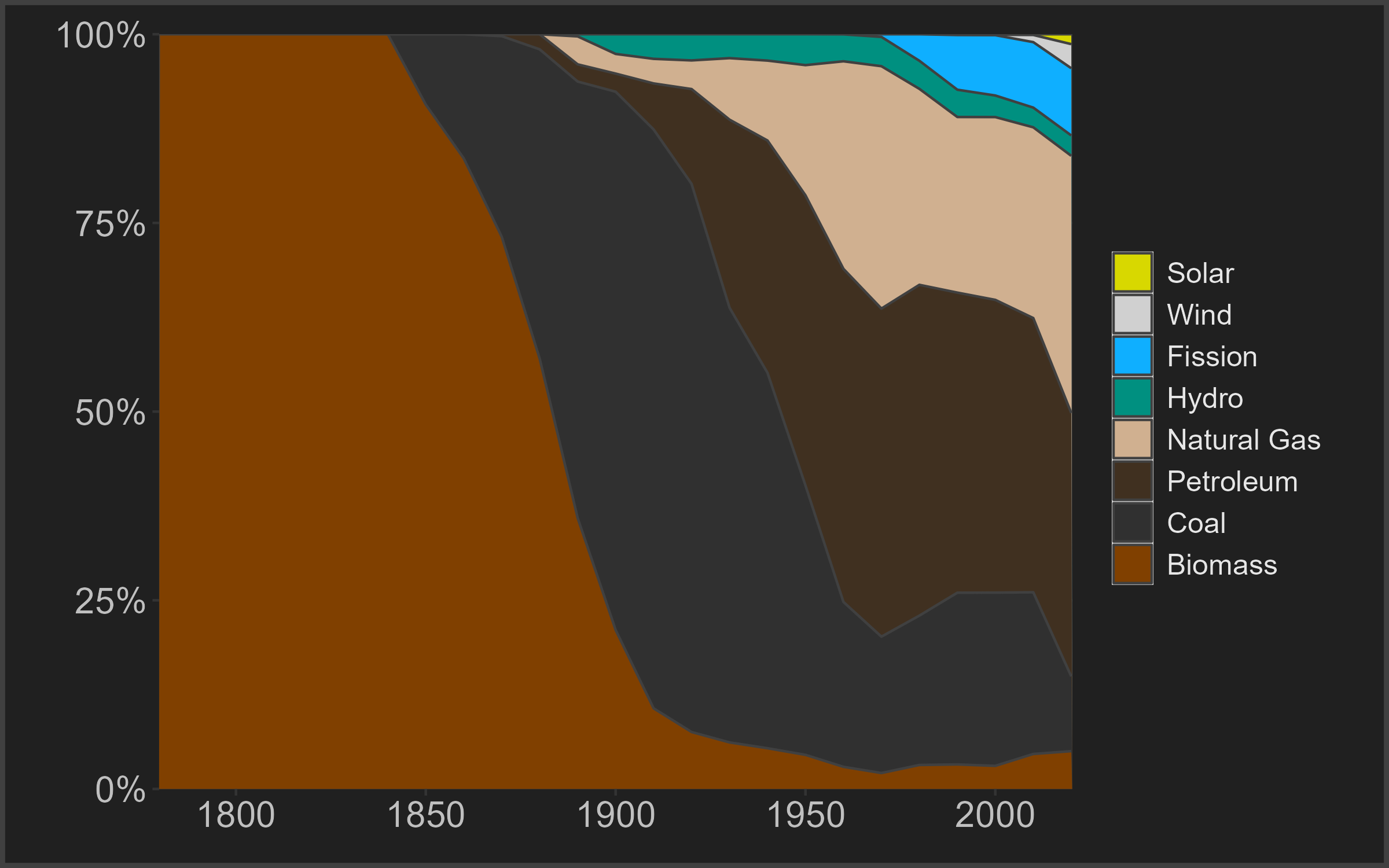
The percentage of energy use by source

Energy consumption by source

From its founding until the late 19th century, population and energy use in the United States both increased by about 3% per year, resulting in a relatively constant per capita energy use of 100 million BTU. Wood made up the majority of this until near the end of the 1800s, meaning the average American burned eight tons of wood each year.

The Industrial Revolution in the United States saw an increased use of coal. By the late 1800s, it had surpassed wood as the major source of energy, as it was cheaper for those living in cities. Lighting, heating and transportation could all be fueled by coal. Between 1925 and 1975, coal use was more stagnant, although it dominated the growing electricity sector. Petroleum and natural gas took its place, as car ownership doubled in the two decades after the war, and as the number of pipelines rose dramatically.

During the first half of the 20th century, per capita energy use doubled to 200 million BTU, and reached 300 million BTU by the late 60s. After a peak of 360 million BTU in 1979, per capita consumption generally declined, and dipped below 300 million BTU in 2020. In comparison, the world average increased from 68 to 74 million BTU (72 to 78 GJ) per person between 1980 and 2020.

Domestic oil production peaked in 1970 and did not recover for 40 years. However, oil imports allowed consumption to double. Oil represented the vast majority of net imports during this time. Increased reliance on imported oil coincided with the 1973 oil crisis.

Total imports peaked in 2005, when they represented 30% of total consumption. A consistent decline occurred over the next 15 years, as oil production doubled and domestic use receded. This allowed the United States to be a net exporter of energy for the first time in 70 years. As of 2021, the US net exports 3.9% of energy production.

Around 2010, many other trends began to reverse. By 2020, improvements in fracking had allowed natural gas production to increase by more than half, while coal decreased by half.

Renewables in the 20th century consisted mainly of hydro and wood. Hydro power had been relatively constant since 1970, while wood saw a bump in 1980. Between 2000 and 2020, wind, solar and biofuels increased by a factor of ten. By 2020, wind had surpassed hydro, and biofuels had surpassed wood.

In November 2026, Democratic lawmakers in the US House are debating changes to a major energy permitting bill. Meanwhile, the Senate has started discussing the Bipartisan American Affordability and Jobs Act, which aims to speed up approvals for energy projects. Representative Kathy Castor mentioned ongoing efforts to enhance the bill.

=== 2026 Iran war ===
Instability in the Middle East has driven a push for oil and gas production in the Americas as nations seek reliable supply sources. Across the region—from Canada to Brazil—production is projected to rise by 10 percent by December 2026. Meanwhile, Venezuela and Suriname are ramping up their output, supported by investments from Western oil companies.

== Summary ==
US energy consumption by source (2021)
Source	% of source
Nuclear 8%	120% Electricity
Renewable 12%	6.9% Residential; 2.6% Commercial; 19.6% Industrial; 12.3% Transport; 58.6% Electricity
Natural gas 32%	15.4% Residential; 10.8% Commercial; 33.4% Industrial; 3.9% Transport; 36.5% Electricity
Coal 11%	0.1% Commercial; 9.8% Industrial; 90.0% Electricity
Petroleum 36%	2.6% Residential; 2.4% Commercial; 25.0% Industrial; 69.3% Transport; 0.6% Electricity

US electricity by source and sector (2021)
Source	Electricity	Sector
22.2% Nuclear; 19.5% Renewable; 31.7% Natural gas 26.0% Coal; 0.6% Petroleum	Sales 35% Losses 65%	38.9% Residential; 34.9% Commercial; 26.0% Industrial; 0.02% Transport

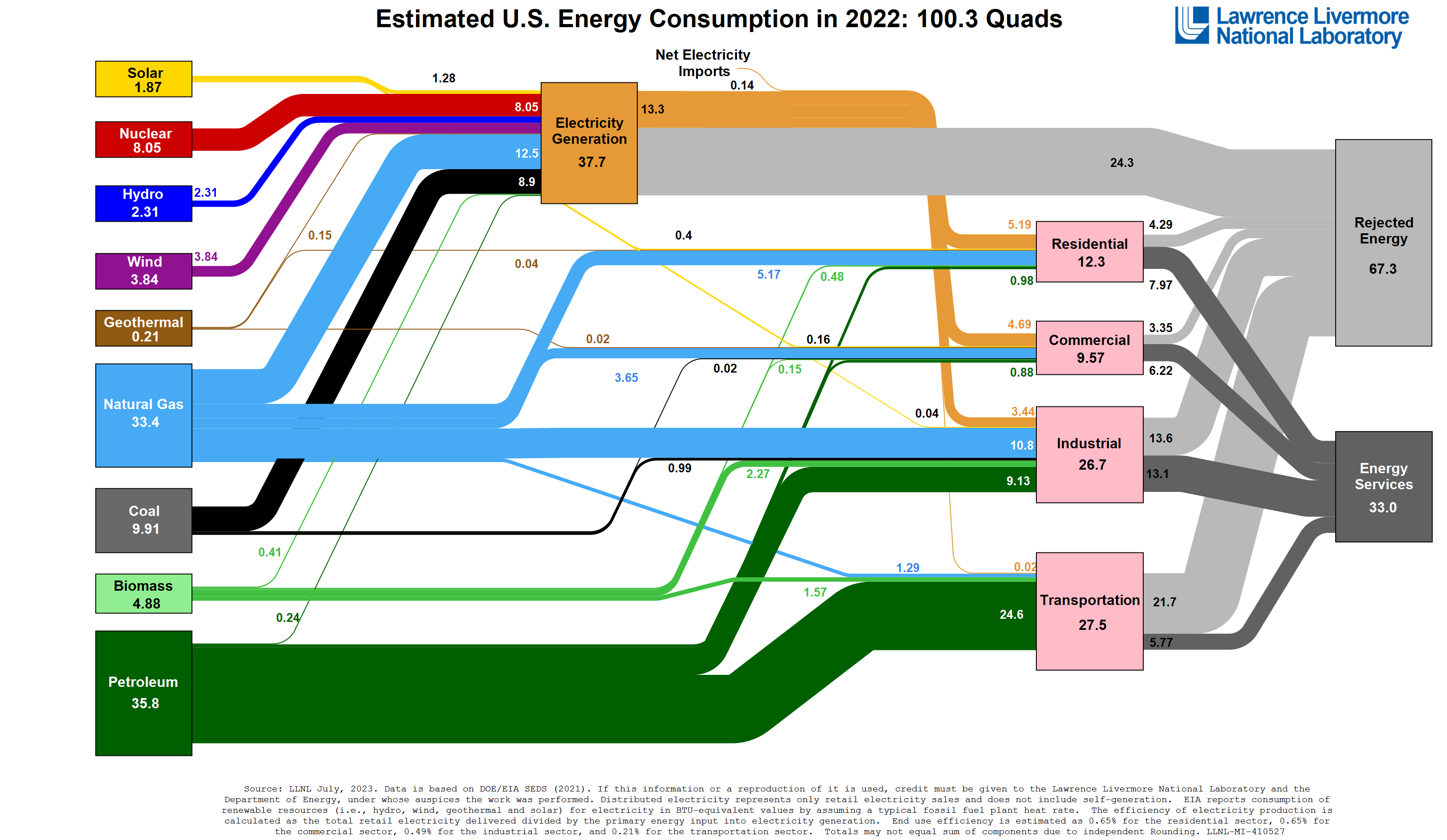
US energy flow, 2022.

US energy consumption by sector (2021)
Sector	% of sector
Residential 21%	4.0% Renewable; 23.5% Natural gas 4.5% Petroleum; 68.0% Electricity
Commercial 18%	1.8% Renewable; 19.7% Natural gas 0.1% Coal; 4.8% Petroleum; 73.6% Electricity
Industrial 33%	7.3% Renewable; 32.6% Natural gas 3.2% Coal; 27.2% Petroleum; 29.7% Electricity
Transport 28%	5.5% Renewable; 4.5% Natural gas 89.8% Petroleum; 0.2% Electricity

== Primary energy production ==
U.S. Energy Information Administration. View source data.

The United States is the world's second-largest producer of energy. It produces 16% of the world's energy, about three-fourths as much as China. Since 2019, the country has been a net exporter of energy. In 2023, 102.8 quads were produced and net exports were 7.6% of production.

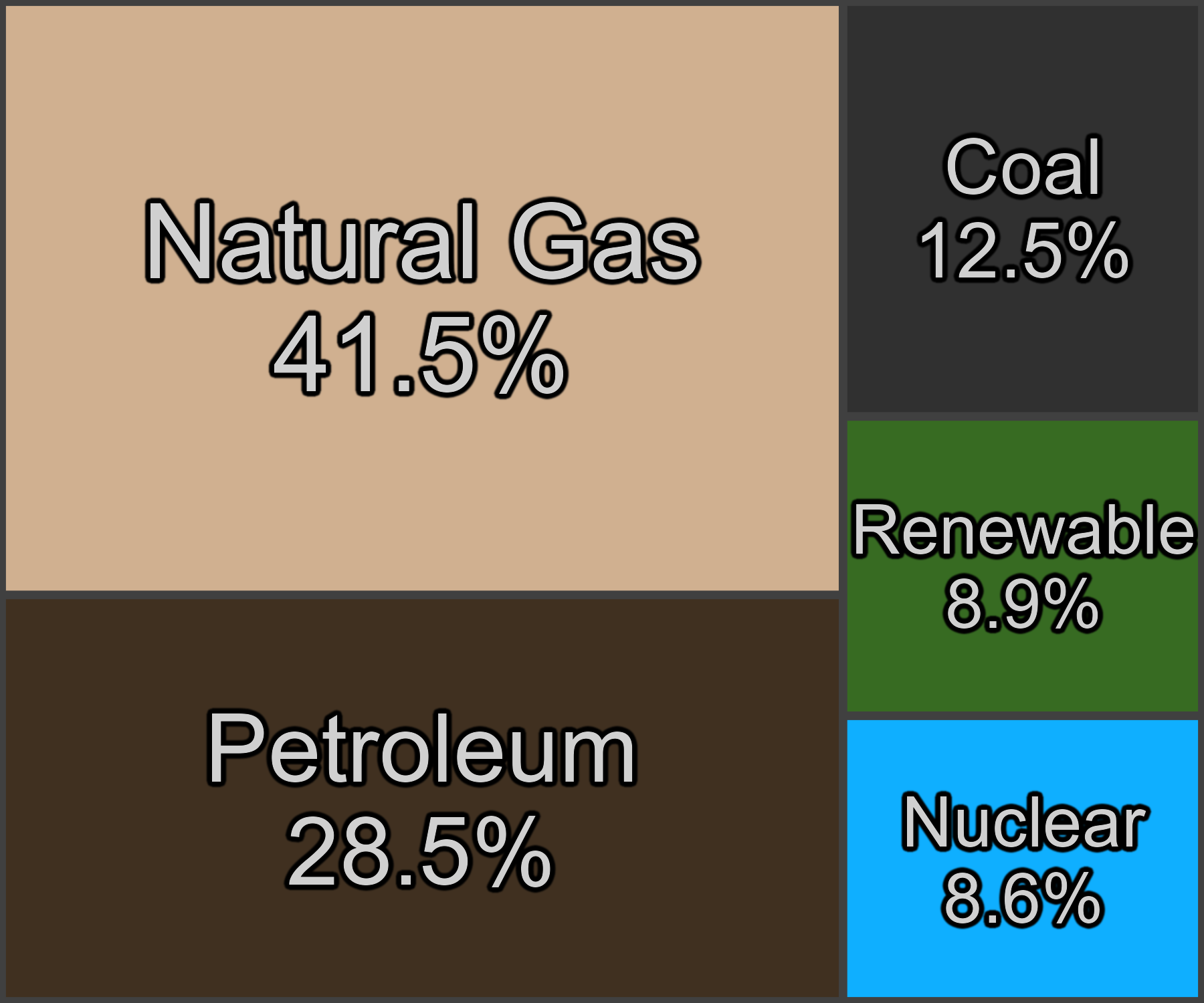
US energy production in 2023

=== Fossil fuels ===
Fossil fuels have long produced most energy in the US, accounting for 84% of total production and 60% of electric generation as of 2023. Although costs for some fossil fuels are declining, renewables are becoming cheaper faster. Despite this, use of fossil fuels has remained near 80% for the past 30 years.

The vast majority of carbon emissions in the US came from fossil fuels. The largest sources for carbon pollution from energy were petroleum (46%), natural gas (35%) and coal (19%), and of petroleum, motor gasoline (21%) and diesel (12%) were the largest contributors. As gas has been replacing coal, emissions from the two combined have declined from a peak in 2008, down 25% as of 2021. During the same time frame, petroleum declined by only 17%. Fossil fuels in the United States produced 8% more carbon dioxide in 2022 compared to 2020.

In 2023, fossil fuels generated 2,509 TWh of electricity, accounting for 60 percent of all electricity generation.

==== Coal ====
Coal made up 11% of production in 2021, 90% of which went to producing electricity. Coal electrified rapidly throughout the 50s, 60s and 70s and half of annual electricity was from coal until the 2010s. Coal peaked in 2006, when it represented a third of total energy production. During the 2010s it underwent a steady decline, mostly being replaced by natural gas. In contrast, net exports have remained near 2 quads in the same time period, but this now amounts to 17% of total production.

The decline of coal has many factors, including the aforementioned rise of natural gas, the closing of old plants, and environmental regulations. Coal supply has not become an issue, as the US has the largest coal reserve in the world, 40% larger than Russia.

The first DC plant in the US was a coal plant in New York City, opened in 1882. The first AC plant was a coal plant in Ehrenfeld, Pennsylvania, opened in 1902. Among the largest plants still operating is the James H. Miller Jr. Electric Generating Plant in West Jefferson, Alabama and among the oldest is the James E. Rogers Energy Complex in Mooresboro, North Carolina.

==== Natural gas ====
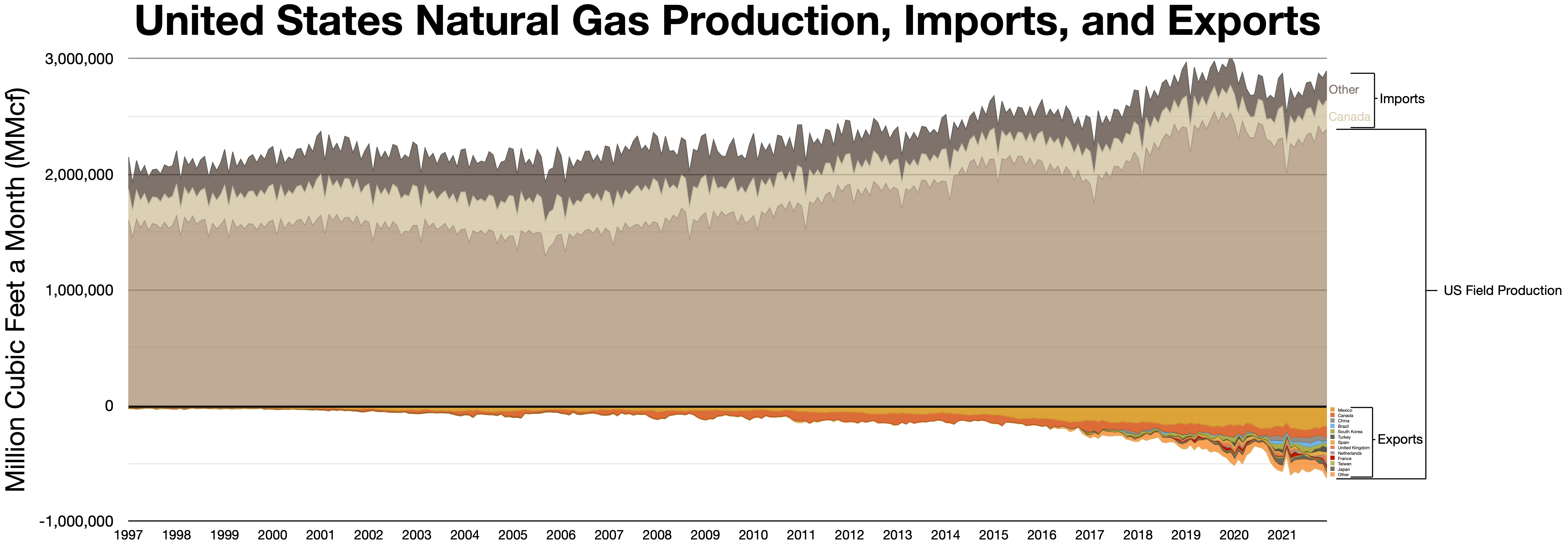
US natural gas production, imports, and exports

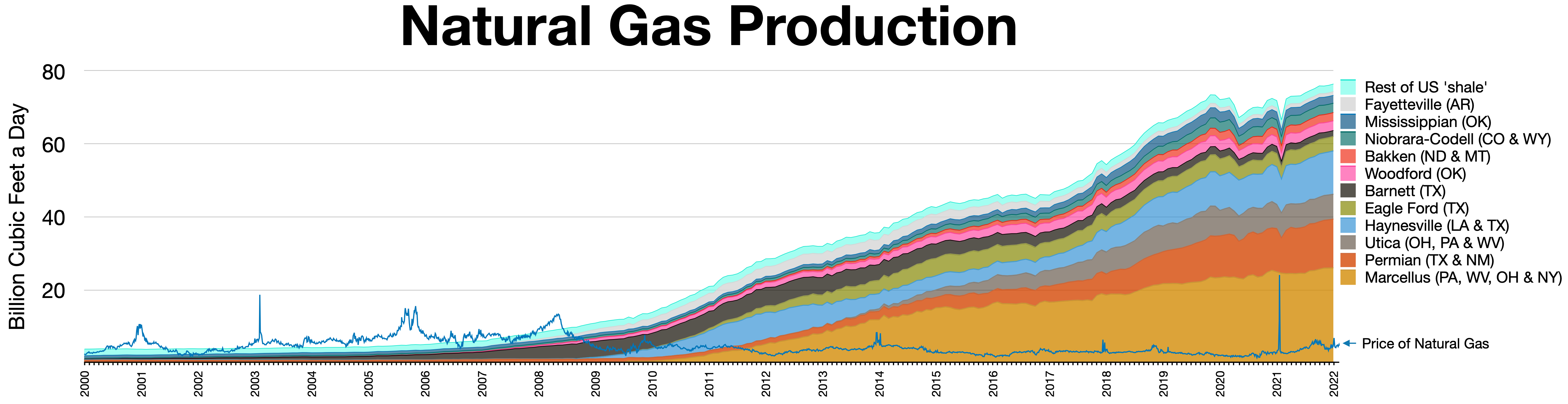
Natural gas production by field

In 2025, dry natural gas production reached a record 39 trillion cubic feet. Natural gas remained the largest source of US domestic energy production. Natural gas surpassed coal for production in 2011 and for generation in 2016. Between 2006 and 2022, the US has gone from net importing 4 quads of natural gas to exporting 4 quads.

The United States has been the world's largest producer of natural gas since 2011, when it surpassed Russia. However, the US ranks 7th in proven reserves. Differences in supply explain why gas is cheaper in the US than it is in Europe.

Among the largest natural gas power plants in the US is West County Energy Center in Palm Beach County, Florida. Philadelphia had the first natural gas distributor in the US.

Natural gas liquids are liquid hydrocarbons obtained from natural gas fields. Production has tripled from 2000 to 2022, now making up 9% of fossil fuels. The US leads the world in NGL production, ahead of Saudi Arabia.

During the 2023-24 winter heating season in the United States, natural gas inventories ended at 2,290 billion cubic feet (Bcf), 39% above the five-year average, due to mild weather resulting in reduced consumption. Withdrawals from storage were approximately 1,500 Bcf, lower than the usual 2,000 Bcf. By March 2024, the Henry Hub spot price had decreased to $1.50 per million British thermal units (MMBtu), significantly below the forecasted $3.10/MMBtu, with expectations of prices staying below $2.00/MMBtu until the second half of 2024, averaging $2.20/MMBtu for the year

==== Petroleum ====
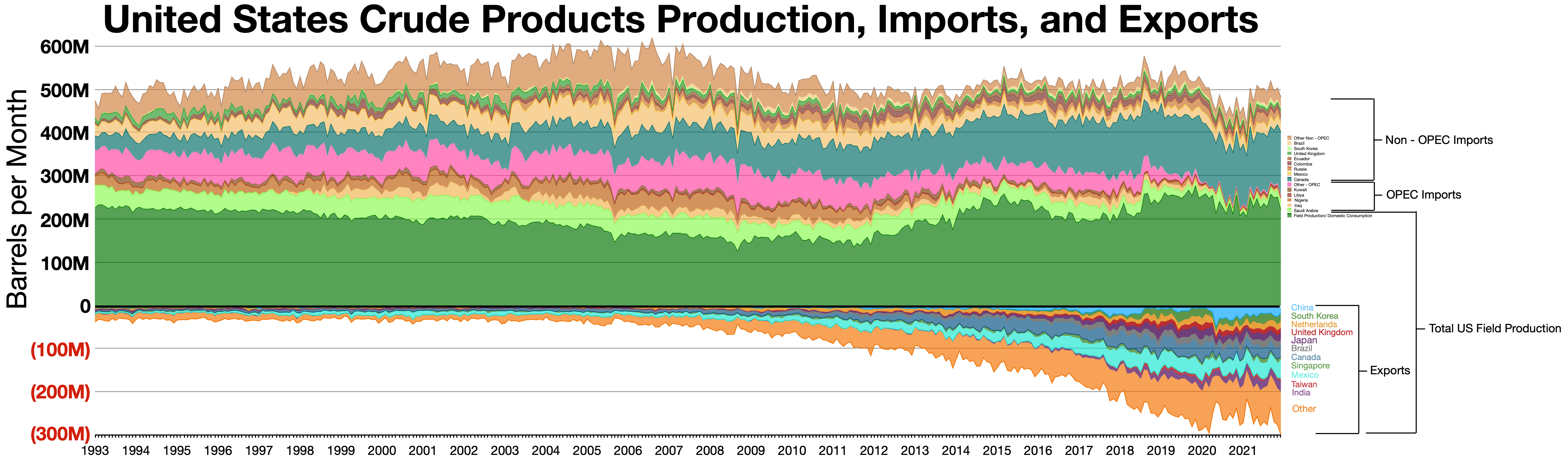
US oil production, imports, and exports

Crude oil made up 24% of production in 2021. Oil has more than doubled from a slump in the early 2000s, even surpassing its previous peak in 1970. Imports have declined during the same time period, but the US still net imports 20% of consumption.

The US has been the largest producer of crude oil since 2018, ahead of Saudi Arabia. Texas produces far more oil than any other state.

U.S. oil and gas production was higher at the end of both the Trump and Biden administrations compared to the beginning of their terms. Oil and gas constitute the majority of energy consumption in the United States. This production not only enhances energy security but also helps maintain lower prices. However, the combustion of oil and gas significantly contributes to climate change.

=== Nuclear ===
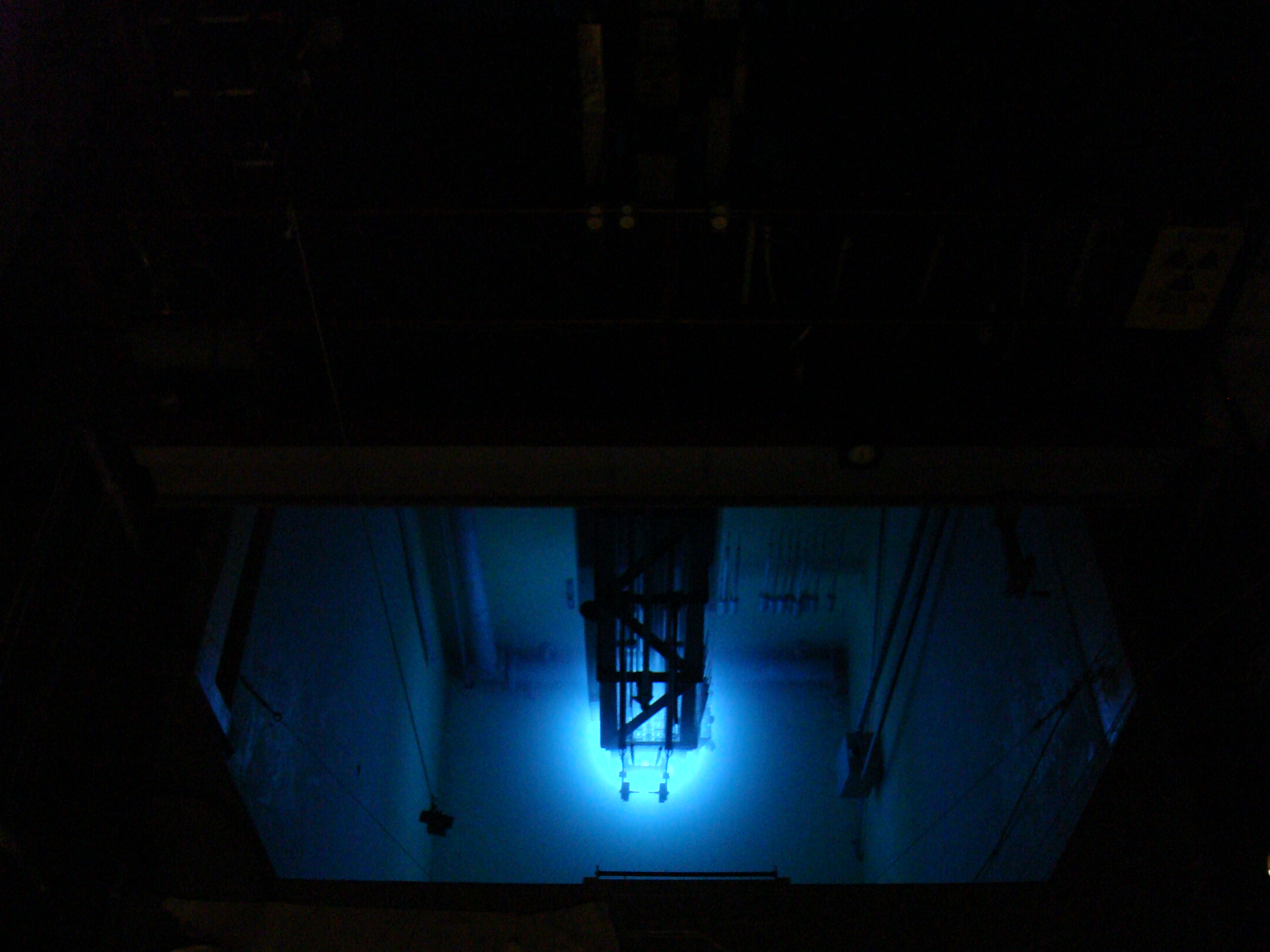
Cherenkov radiation

Nuclear power was 8.3% of total production and 18.8% of electric generation in 2021. Seven states made up half the total: Illinois (12%), Pennsylvania (10%), South Carolina (7%), Alabama (6%), North Carolina (6%), Texas (5%) and Tennessee (5%).

The US generated 772 TWh of nuclear power in 2022, surpassing China (395 TWh) and France (282 TWh). However, nuclear power constitutes a much smaller percentage of total power generation (18%) when compared to France (63%).

Nuclear had significant growth from the 70s through the 90s, but has stagnated since. A cessation of new nuclear plant construction coincided with the accident at Three Mile Island. Future growth may come from smaller reactors.

Among the largest nuclear plants in the US are Grand Gulf in Claiborne County, Mississippi and Peach Bottom in York County, Pennsylvania. The oldest reactor still in commercial operation is Nine Mile Point in Scriba, New York.

=== Renewables ===
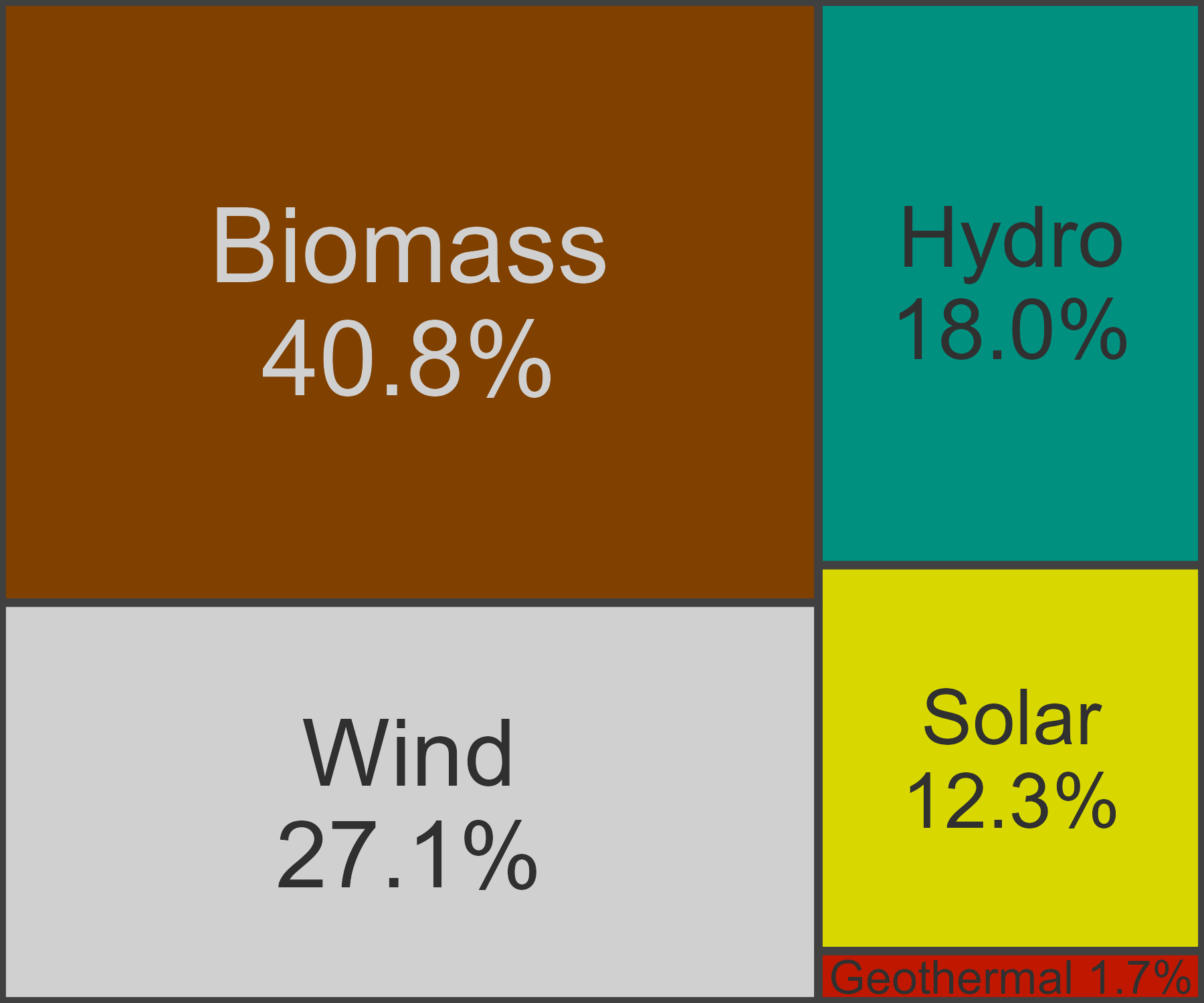
Renewable energy sources, 2021.

Renewable energy in the United States accounted for 12.5% of the total production in 2021, and 20.7% of electric generation. The category has seen rapid growth, doubling in total output between 2000 and 2020. They have exceeded nuclear since 2011 and surpassed coal in 2020 for the first time since wood fuel fell out of use.

Renewables are expected to continue growing. Because many of these are variable renewable energy, there are plans for considerable growth in battery storage. As of 2025, 755 counties have bans on wind or solar energy production.

==== Biomass ====
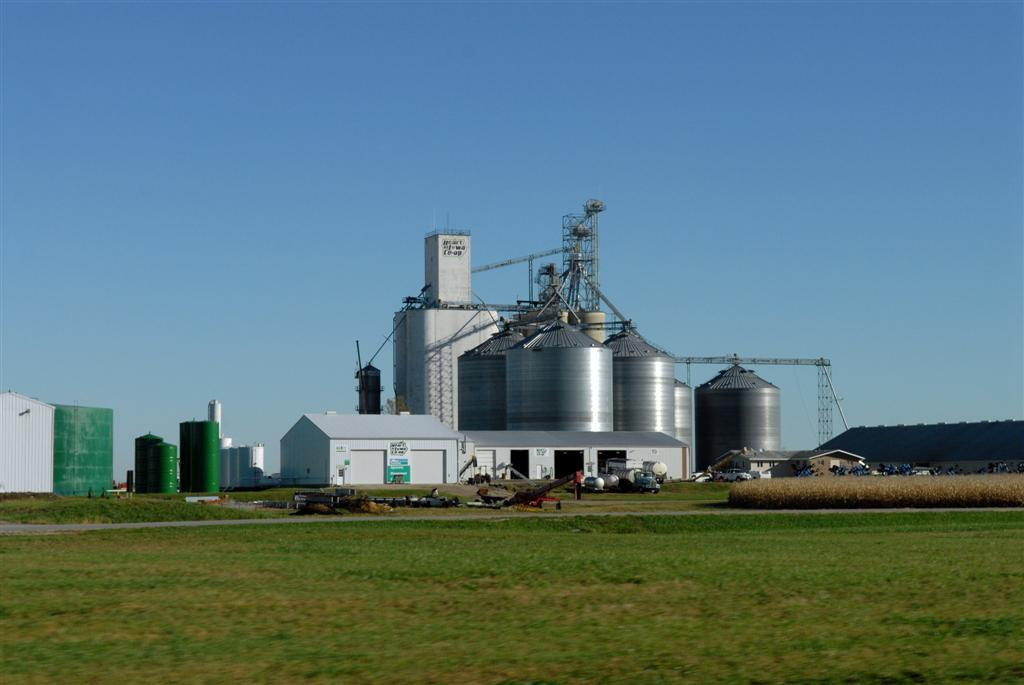
An ethanol plant in Nevada, Iowa

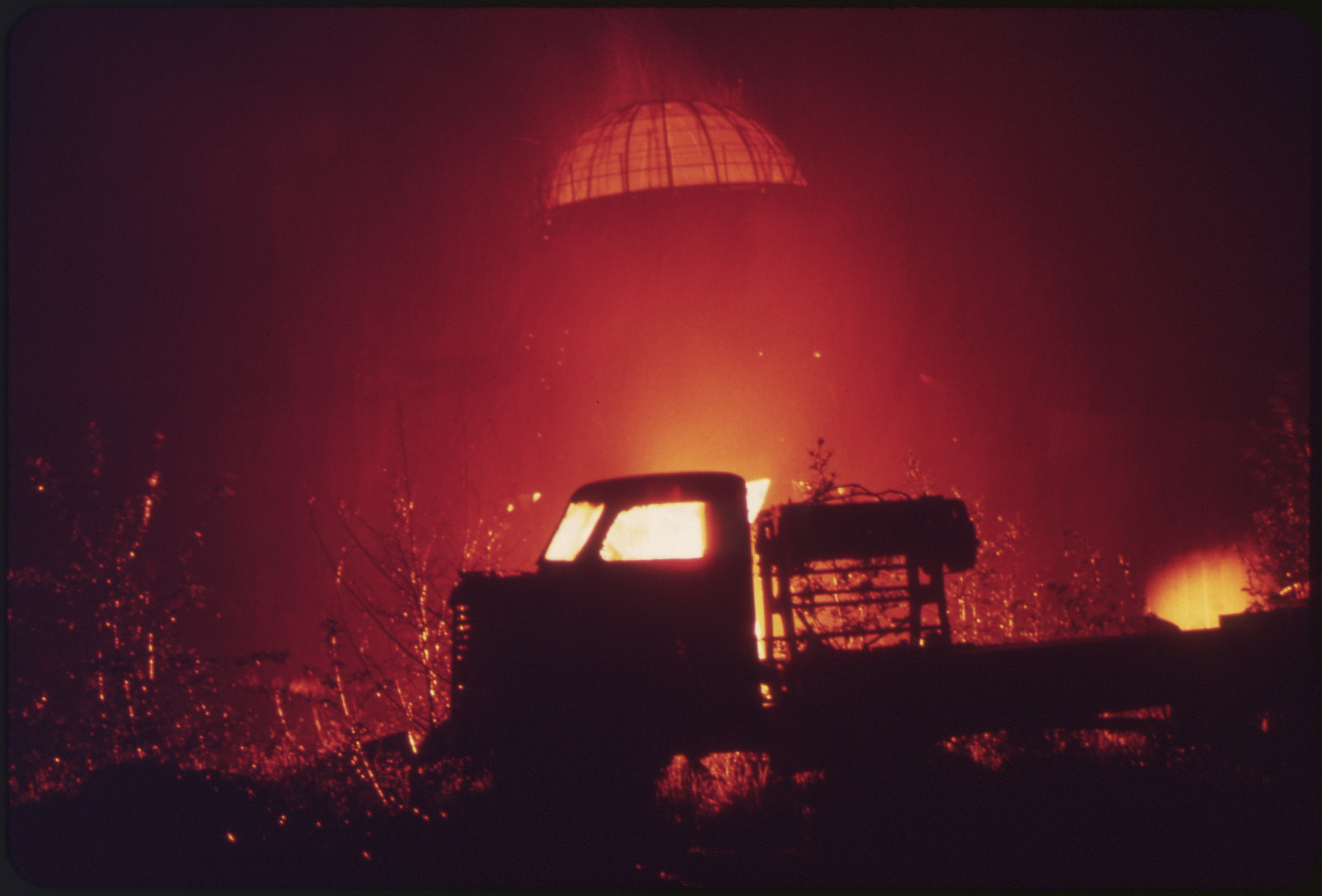
Wood burner in Scotia, California

Biomass made up 5% of total production and 38% of renewables in 2022. About 49% of this was biofuels, 43% was wood, and 8% was waste and other biomass.

Ethanol made up the majority of biofuels in 2022, while biodiesel and renewable diesel made up about 16%. For ethanol, about 40% of the available energy is lost or diverted to co-products during the manufacturing process, and the equivalent of 20% is used to power and run the equipment. About 45% of domestic corn output goes toward producing ethanol. The US led the world in ethanol production in 2021, producing more than half of the total. The US is a net exporter of biofuels.

Use of biofuels increased by a factor of 10 between 2000 and 2020, eventually exceeding wood. The desire for ethanol originated from the need to replace methyl tert-butyl ether, which was contaminating groundwater. The Energy Policy Act of 2005 mandated an increased use of ethanol. Most gasoline sold in the US contains up to 10% ethanol.

Industry uses two-thirds of the wood fuel in the US, while the residential sector uses about a quarter. Wood and paper factories use wood waste on-site to reduce their energy costs. About 9% of homes used firewood in 2020.

Wood made up the majority of energy consumption until near the end of the 1800s, after which it declined in total use for several decades, to about half its peak. The 80s saw the first significant increase in over a century, of about 65%, before declining again by the 2010s.

==== Geothermal ====
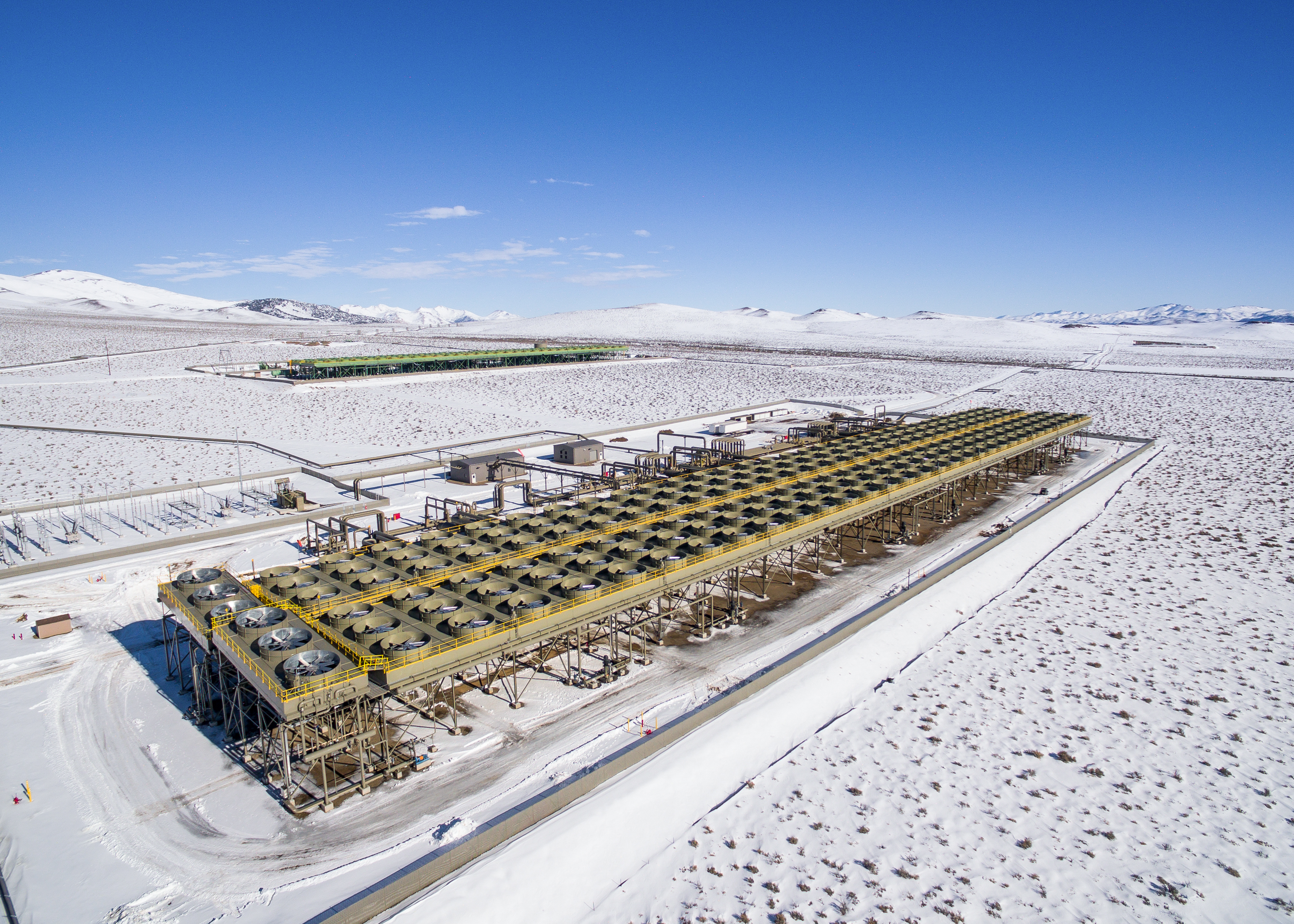
McGinness Hills in Nevada

Two-thirds of the geothermal energy in the US in 2021 was electric, with the remainder being direct use and heat pumps. Geothermal power made up 2% of renewable generation, 70% of which came from California. The Geysers is the largest complex of geothermal energy production in the world. The US ranks first in geothermal capacity, ahead of Indonesia and the Philippines.

==== Hydro ====
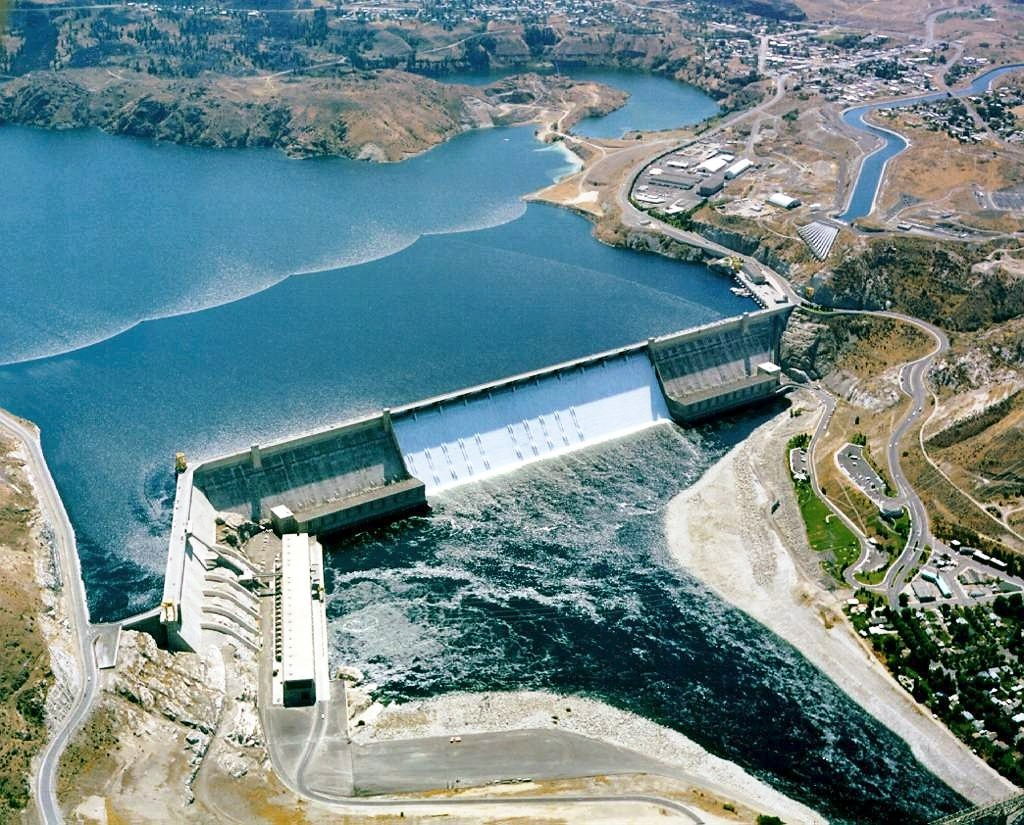
Grand Coulee Dam in Washington

Hydro made up 6% of electric generation and 29% of renewable generation in 2021. Three states made up over half of the total: Washington (29%), New York (12%) and Oregon (11%). Overall 246 TWh were generated across 1,449 conventional plants and 40 pumped storage plants. As of 2021, the US was fourth in the world in total hydroelectric generation behind Canada and Brazil, each generating over 350 TWh. China produced the most, with an estimated 1,300 TWh.

Hydro has been used in the US since 1880 when it powered the Wolverine Chair factory in Grand Rapids, Michigan. Additionally electricity from hydropower has been sold in the U.S. since 1882 with a plant in Appleton, Wisconsin being the first to sell it.By 1950, 29% of total electricity production came from hydro, as it produced 96 TWh. Hydro generation had tripled by the 70s, but has not consistently grown since. Hydro has had large fluctuations from year to year: for example in 2010, generation jumped from 253 to 311 TWh the next year, before dropping to 269 TWh the year after that. While hydro has maintained generation in the 200 to 350 TWh range for the past few decades, its share of the total has declined as other sources have risen. Since 2019, wind power has exceeded hydro as the largest renewable electricity source.

At 132 years old, the plant in Whiting, Wisconsin is the oldest power plant still running in the US. The Grand Coulee Dam is the largest plant for hydro and in general in the US, and the fifth-largest hydro plant in the world. Built in Washington in 1942, it continues to operate with a capacity of 6,765 MW. The Bath County Pumped Storage Station is the second-largest such facility in the world, with a capacity of 3,003 MW.

==== Solar ====
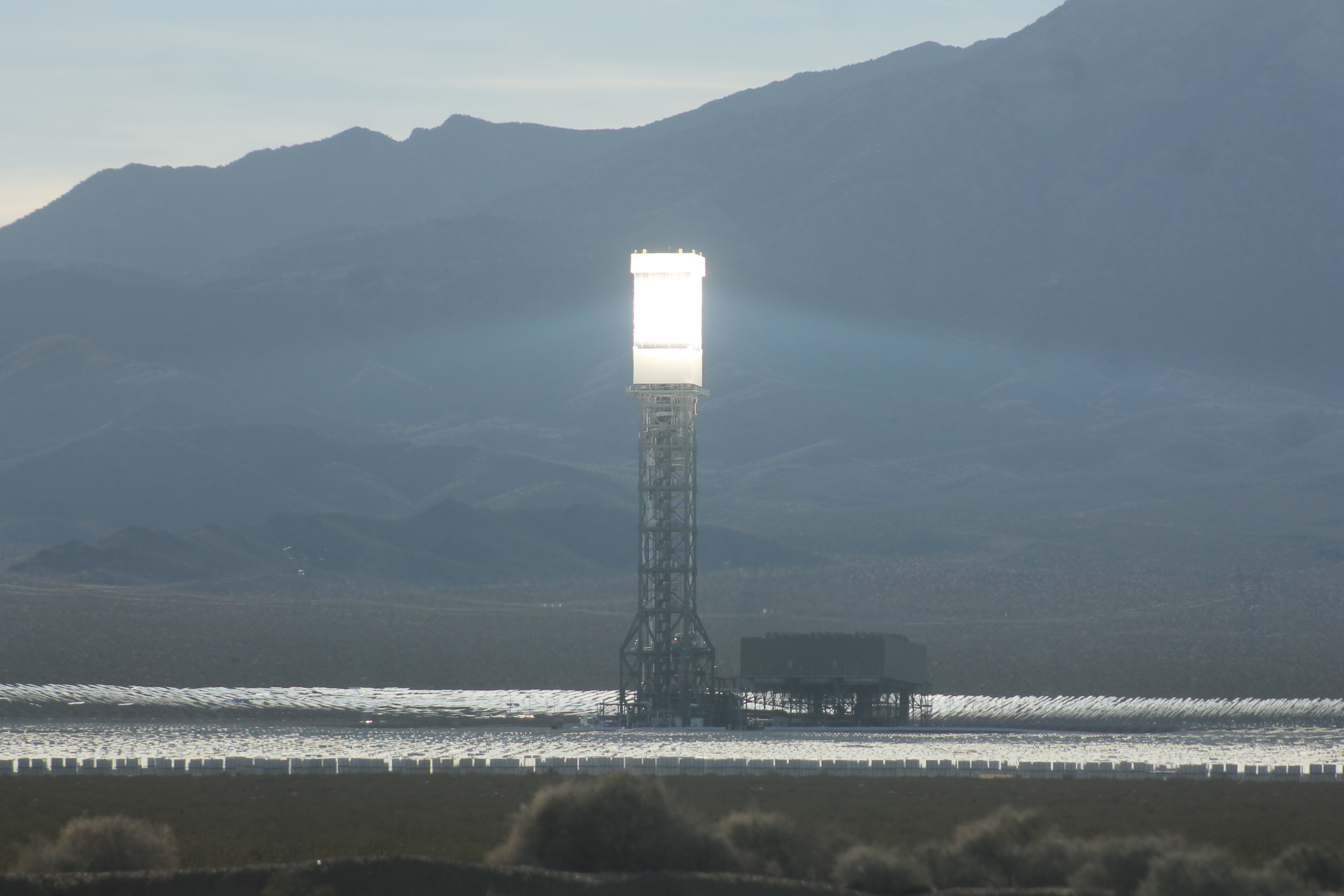
Concentrated solar thermal plant (Ivanpah Solar)

Solar made up 4% of electric generation and 19% of renewable generation in 2021. Of the 164 TWh generated, 70% was by utilities and an estimated 30% was small-scale such as rooftop solar. Three states made up over half of total grid generation: California (30%), Texas (13%) and North Carolina (9%). In 2021, the US grid produced the second most solar power in the world, behind China's 328 GWh.

Since 2006, solar has been the fastest growing energy source in the US, expanding 50% per year on average. The largest solar farms in the US include Solar Star in Rosamond, California, Desert Sunlight in Desert Center, California and Copper Mountain in Boulder City, Nevada. The Bureau of Land Management leases federal land to be used for solar farms.

Almost all states employ net metering to compensate owners of small-scale solar, although policies by state vary considerably.

==== Wind ====
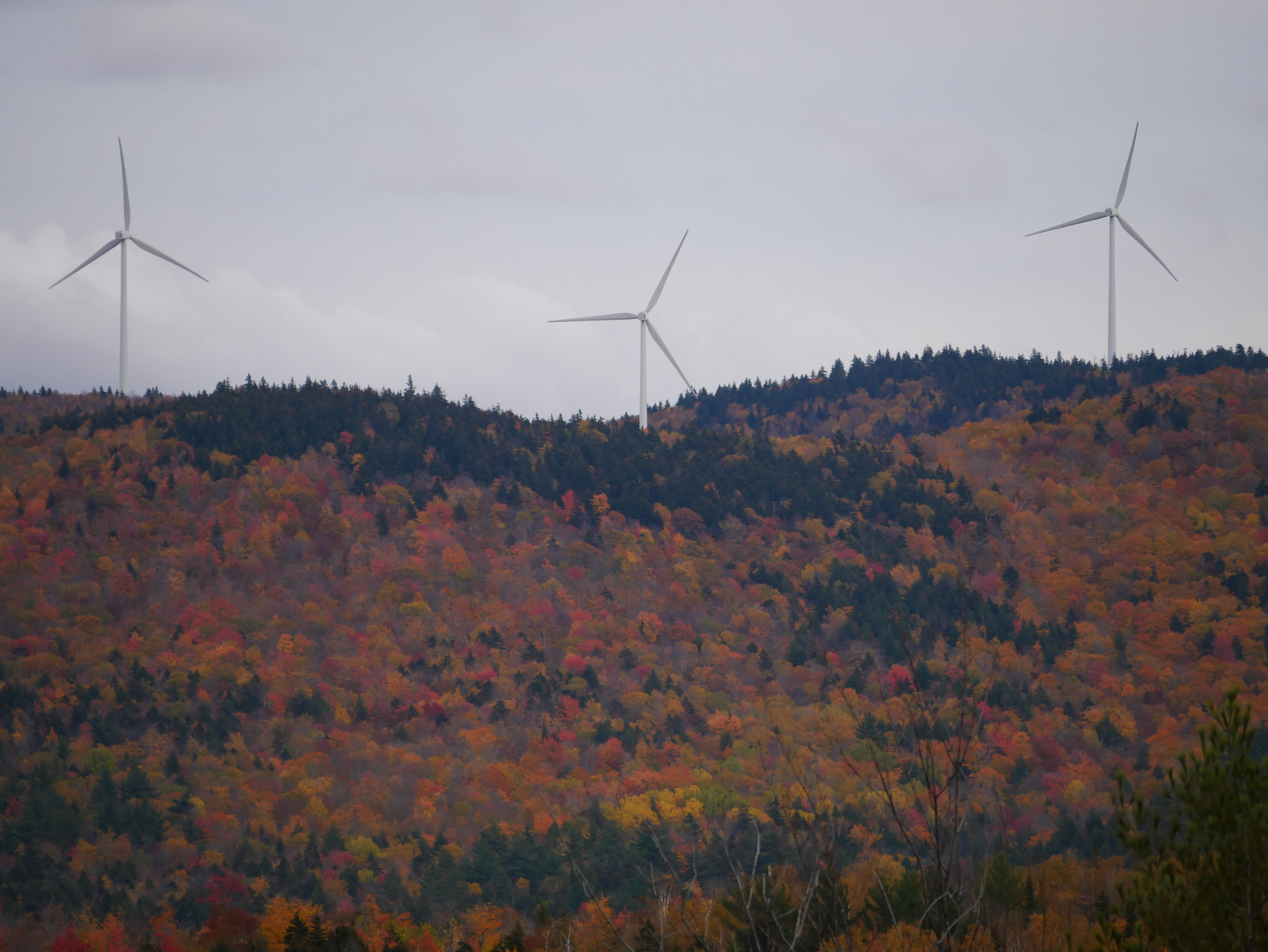
Wind turbines in Maine

Wind made up 9% of electric generation and 44% of renewable generation in 2021. Four states made up over half of the total: Texas (26%), Iowa (10%), California (9%) and Kansas (7%). The US grid produces significantly more wind power than Germany or India, but less than half of China.

Since 1998, wind power has grown 23% per year on average in the US. Prominent areas for wind turbines include Alta Wind in Kern County, California, Shepherds Flat in Gilliam County, Oregon and Roscoe Wind Farm in Nolan County, Texas.

== Final energy consumption ==
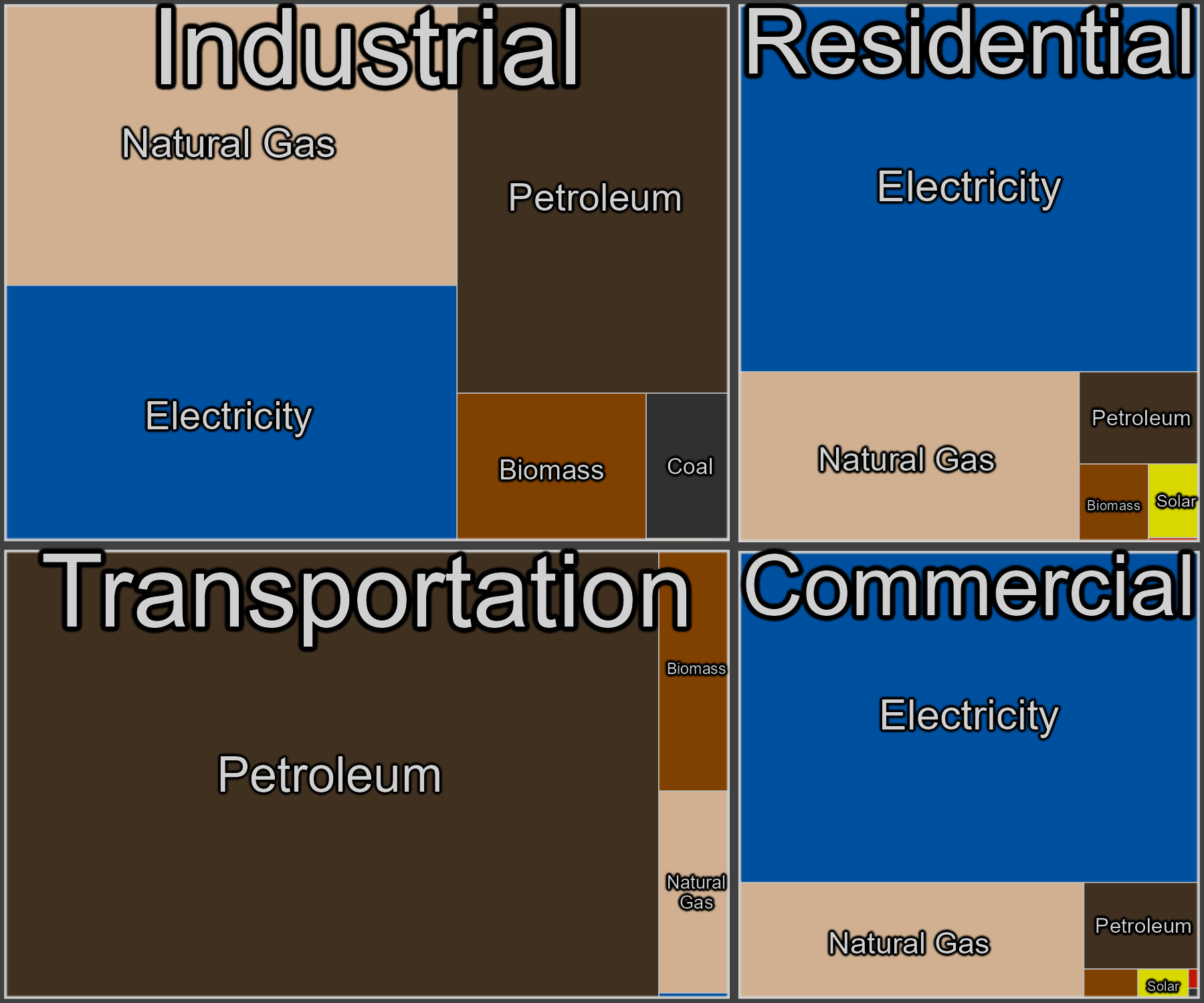
Consumption by sector, 2021

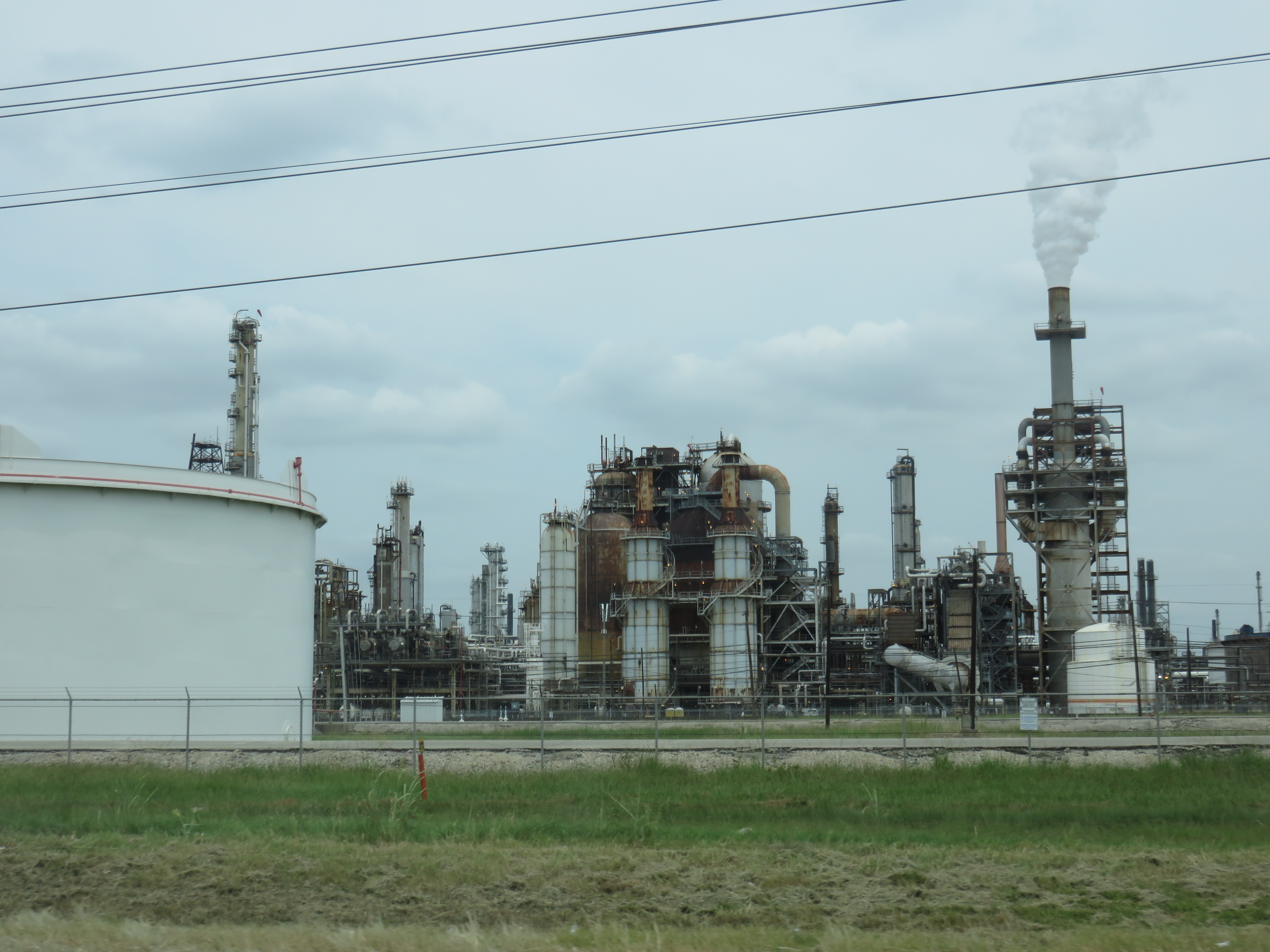
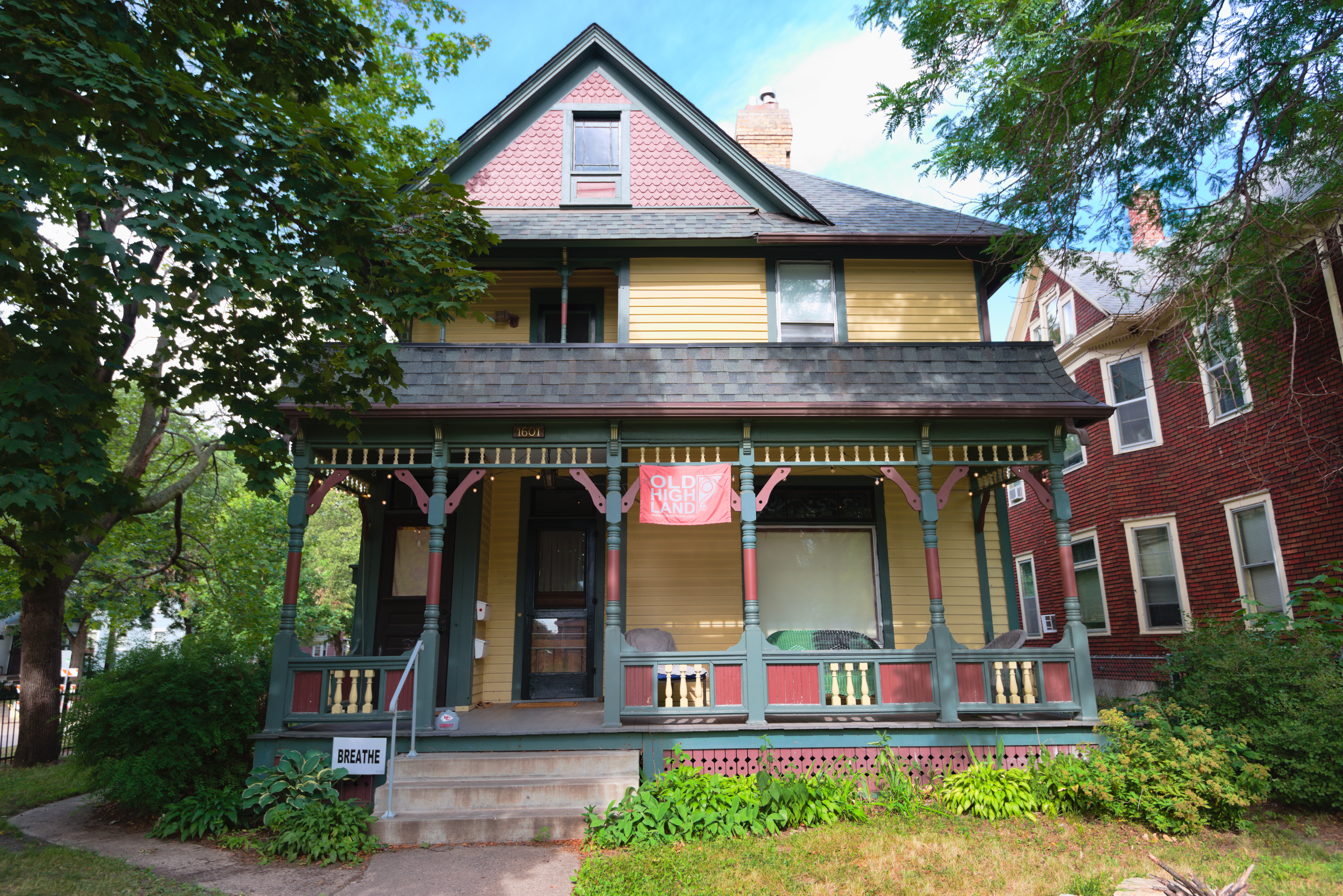
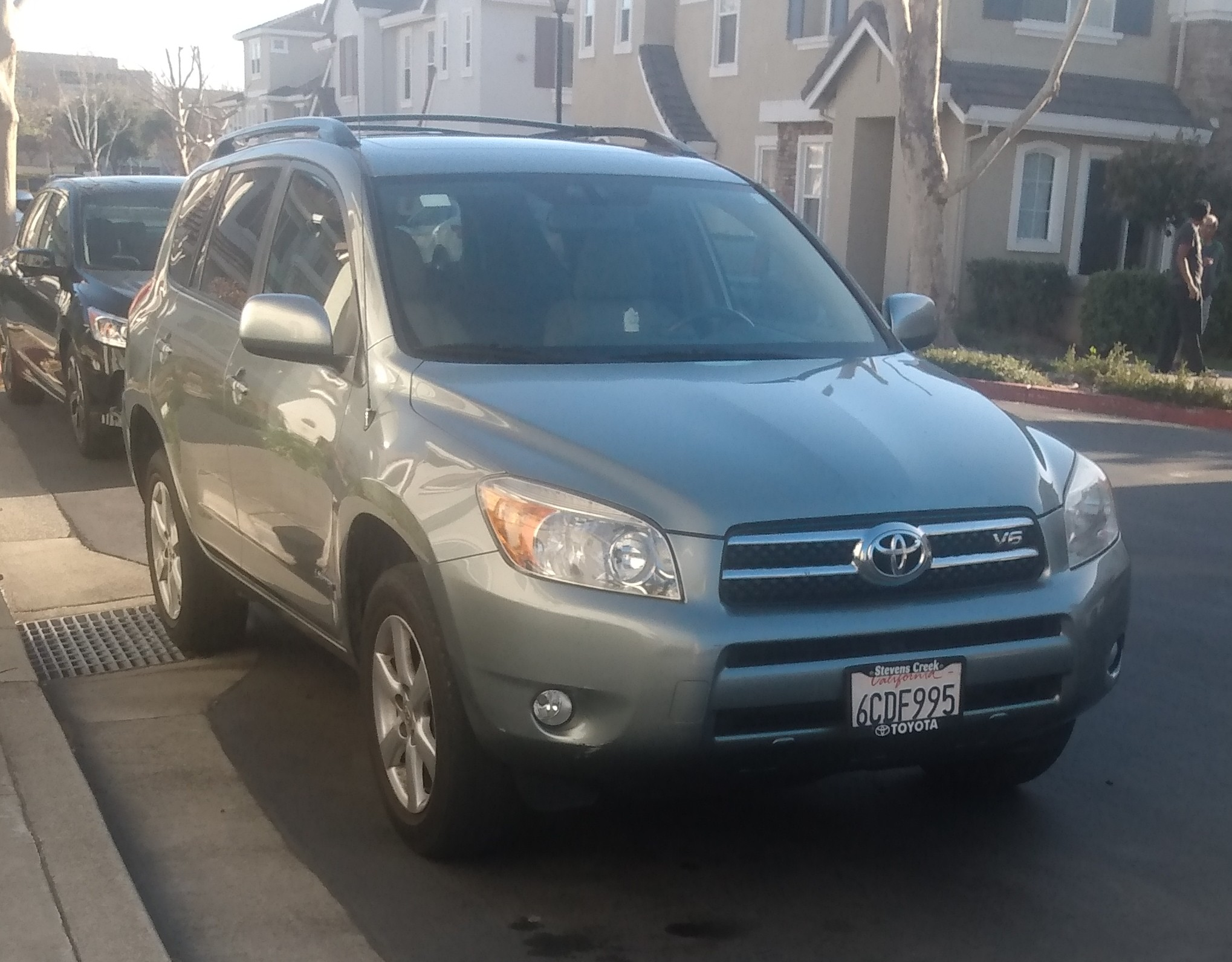
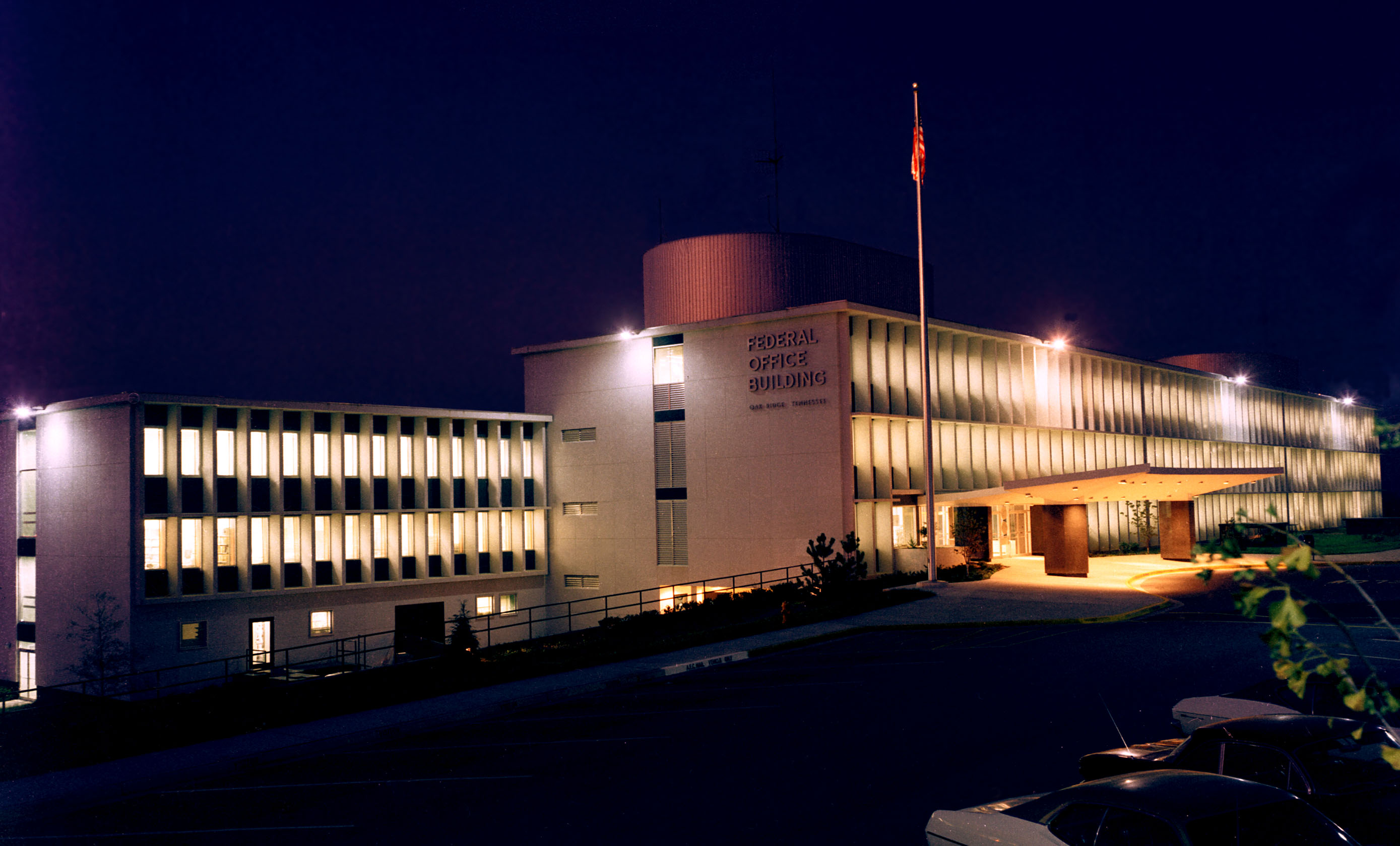
An example of each consumption sector: a refinery, a house, a car and an office

Industry has long been the country's largest energy sector. It used 33% of total energy in 2021, most of which was divided evenly between natural gas, electricity and petroleum. A survey from 2018 estimated that the largest energy users were the chemical industry (30%), petroleum and coal processing (18%), mining (9%) and paper (9%).

The most energy-intensive industry was by far petroleum and coal, at over 30 billion BTU per employee. The paper industry was second at 6.5 billion BTU per employee. Each of these handles energy sources as part of their raw materials (fossil fuels and wood). The same survey found that half of the electric use was to drive machines and about 10% each for heating, cooling and electro-chemical processes. Most of the remainder was for factory lighting and HVAC. About half of the natural gas was for process heating, and most of the rest was for boilers.

Transportation used 28% of energy, almost all of which was petroleum and other fuels. Half of the combustible fuels that make up the transportation sector were gasoline, and half of the vehicle usage was for cars and small trucks. Diesel and heavier trucks each made up about a quarter of their respective categories; jet fuel and aircraft were about a tenth each. Biofuels such as ethanol and biodiesel made up 5%, while natural gas was 4%. Electricity from mass transit was 0.2%; electricity for light passenger vehicles is counted in other sectors, but figures from the US Department of Energy estimate that 2.1 million electric vehicles used 6.1 TWh to travel 19 billion miles, indicating an average fuel efficiency of 3.1 miles per kWh.

Over two-thirds of the energy used by homes, offices, and other commercial businesses is electric, including electric losses. Most of the energy used in homes was for space heating (34%) and water heating (19%), much more than the amount used for space cooling (16%) and refrigeration (7%). Businesses use similar percentages for space cooling and refrigeration. They use less for space and water heating but more for lighting and cooking.

Most homes in the US are single-family detached, which on average use almost triple the energy of apartments in larger buildings. However, single family households have 50% more persons and triple the floor space. Usage per square foot of living space is roughly equal for most housing types except small apartment buildings and mobile homes. Small apartments are more likely to be older than other housing types, while mobile homes tend to have poor insulation.

=== Regional variation ===
The state with the lowest per capita energy use is Rhode Island, at 161 million BTU per year, and the highest is Louisiana, at 908 million BTU per year. Energy use and prices often have an inverse relationship; Hawaii uses some of the least energy per capita but pays the highest price on average, while Louisiana pays the least on average.

Residential prices follow a similar trend, but the differences between states are usually less drastic. The exception is Hawaii, which pays 84 cents per million BTU, more than double the next largest state of Florida, which pays 33 cents.

Household energy use varies by home type and by region. Although single-family detached homes are less common in the Northeast, the average house there uses 60% more energy than one in the West. Some of the regional differences can be explained by climate, as two-thirds of northeastern homes are in cold regions, while less than a third of western homes are.

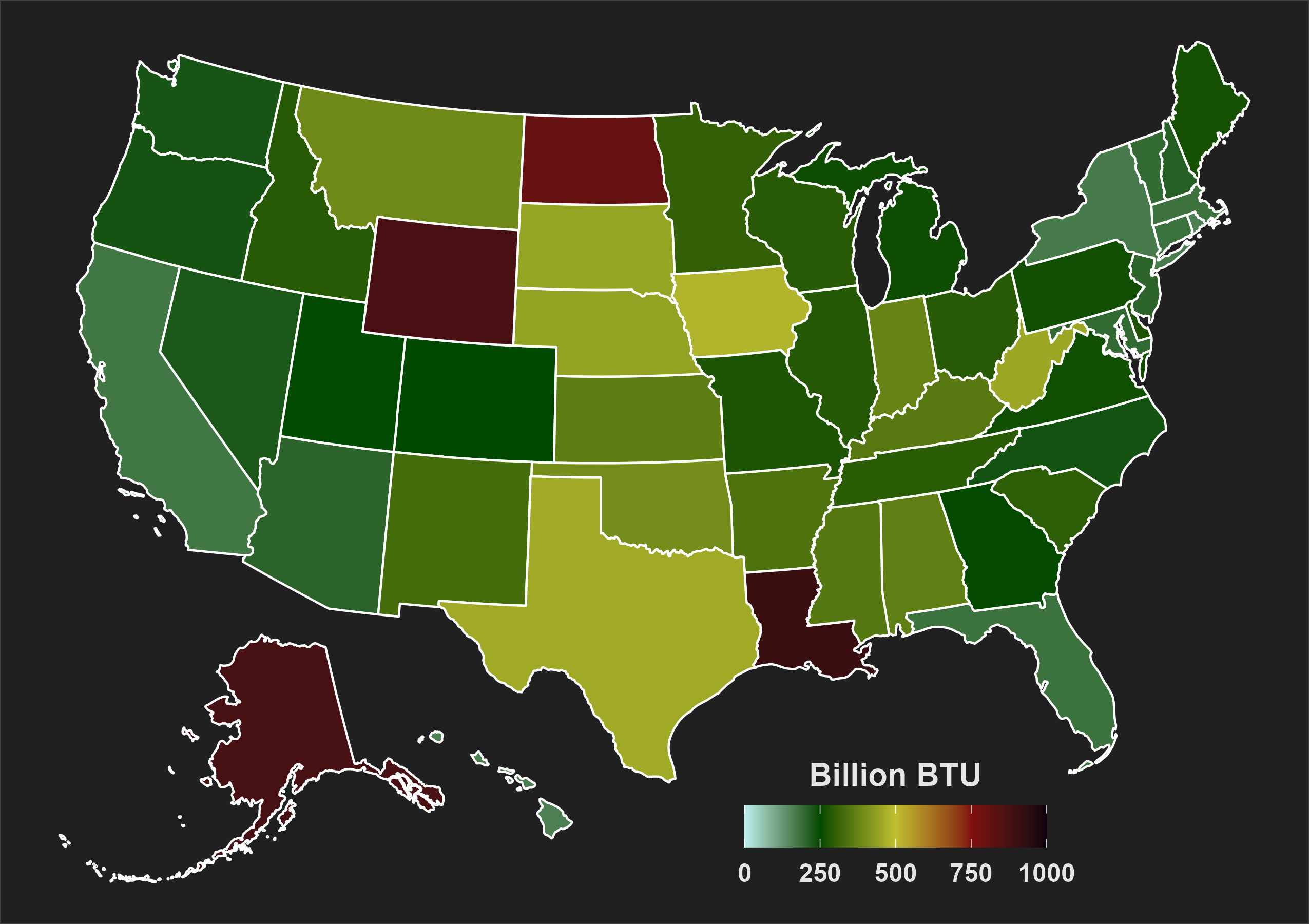
Overall use per capita

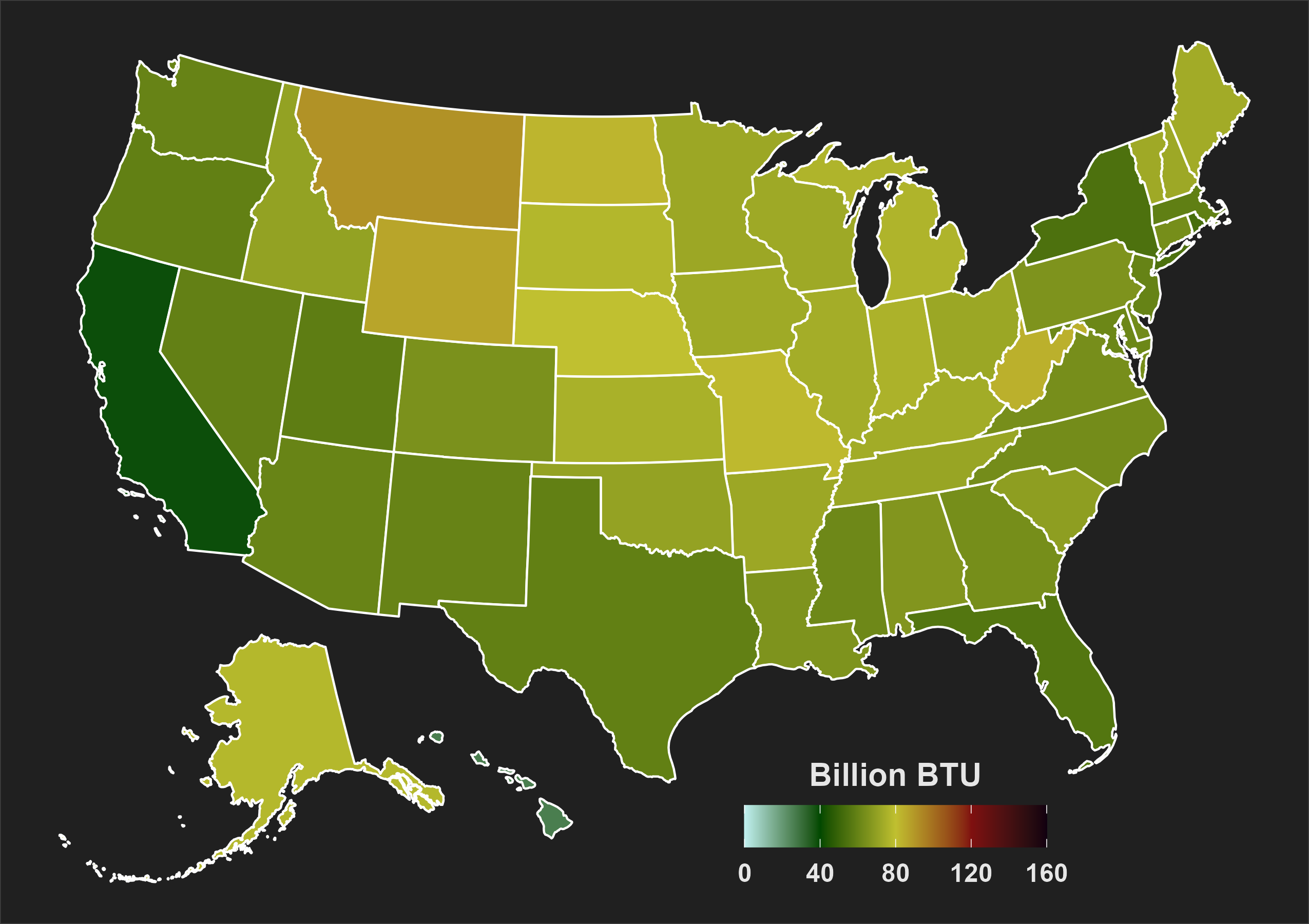
Home use per capita

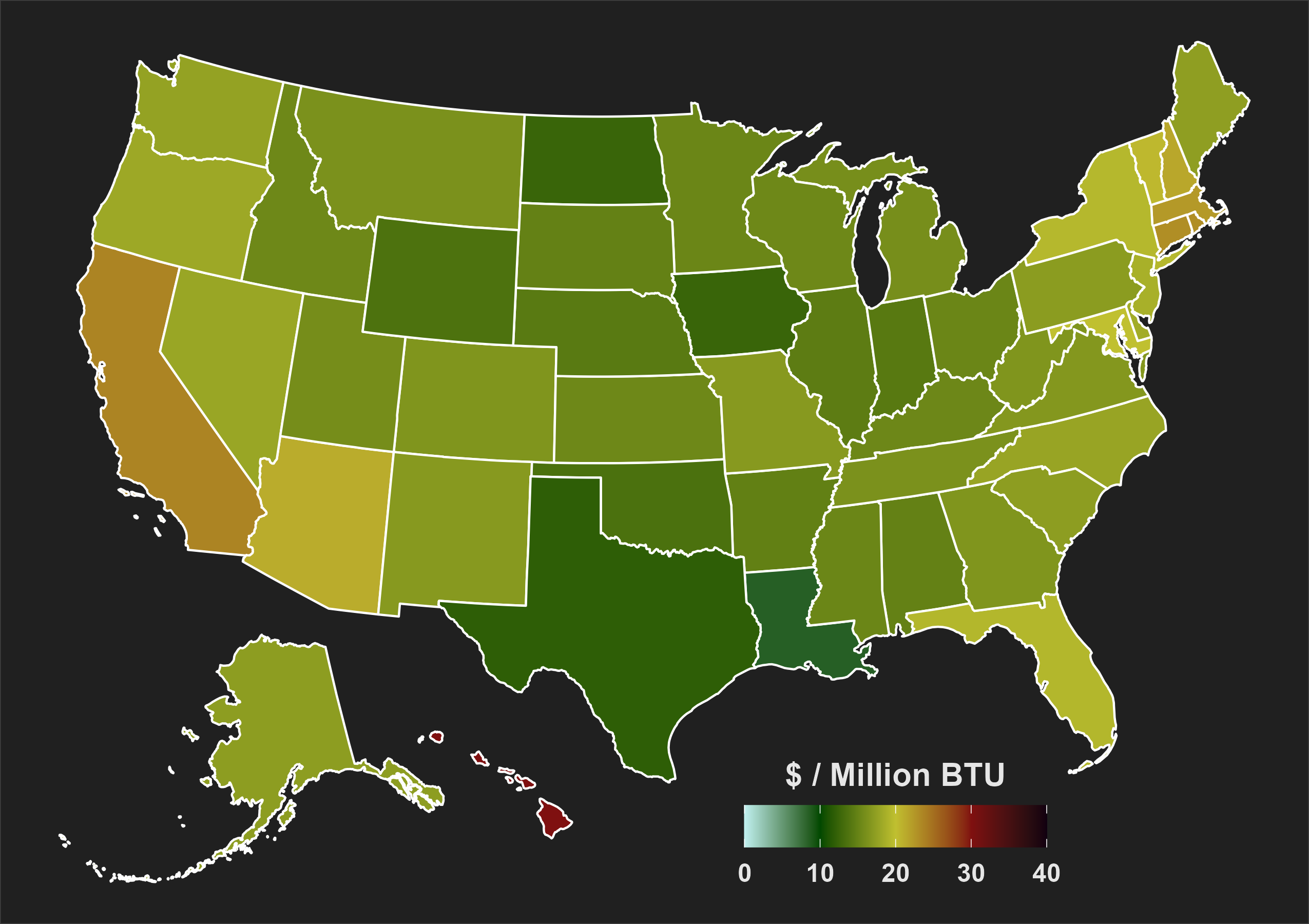
Overall price per million BTU

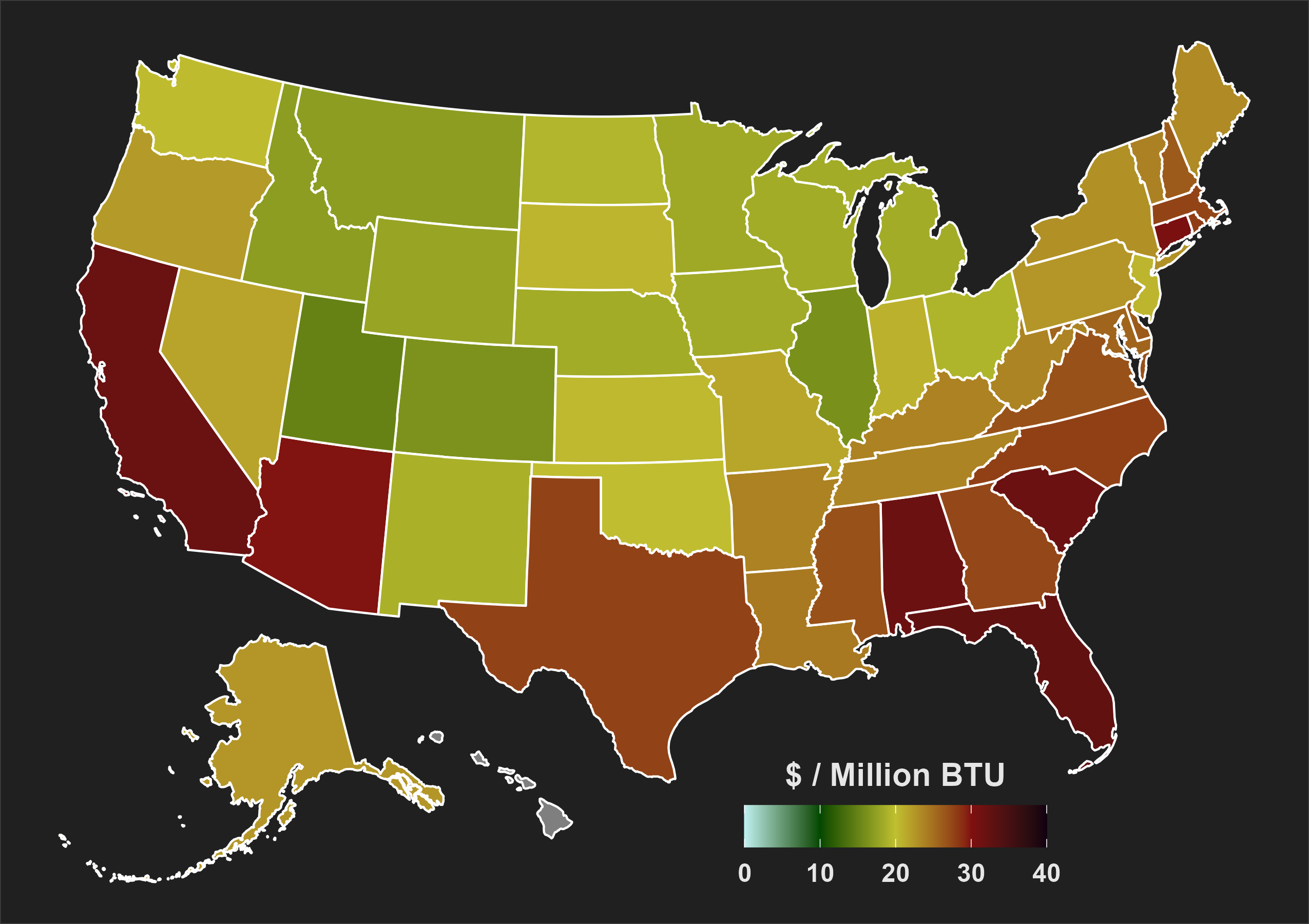
Home price per million BTU

The land-use decisions of cities and towns also explain some of the regional differences in energy use. Townhouses are more energy efficient than single-family homes because less heat, for example, is used per person. Similarly, areas with more homes in a compact neighborhood encourage walking, biking and transit, thereby reducing transportation energy use. A 2011 U.S. EPA study found that multi-family homes in urban neighborhoods, with well-insulated buildings and fuel-efficient cars, use less than two-thirds of the energy used by conventionally built single-family houses in suburban areas (with standard cars).

== Electricity ==
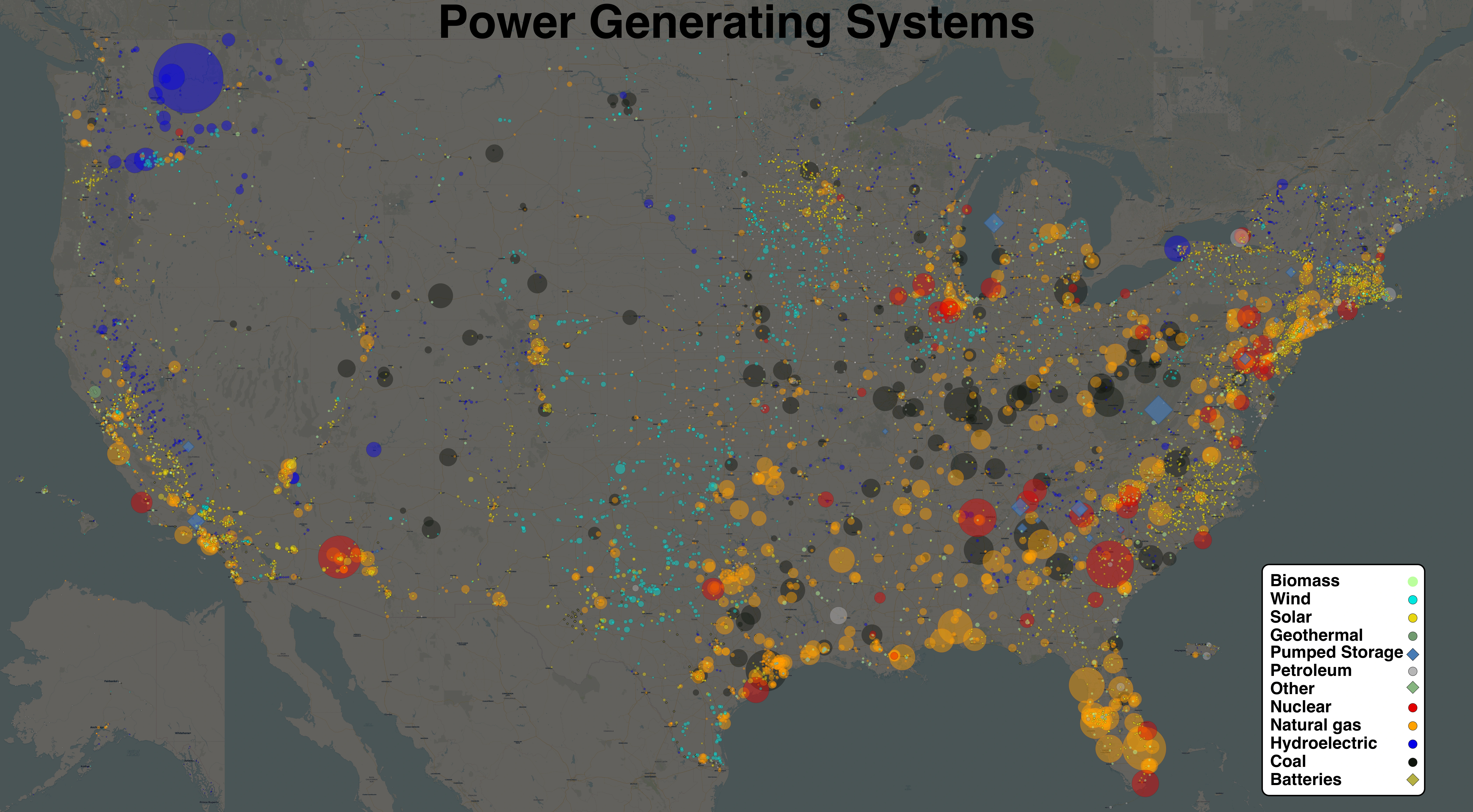
United States power stations by type and nameplate capacity

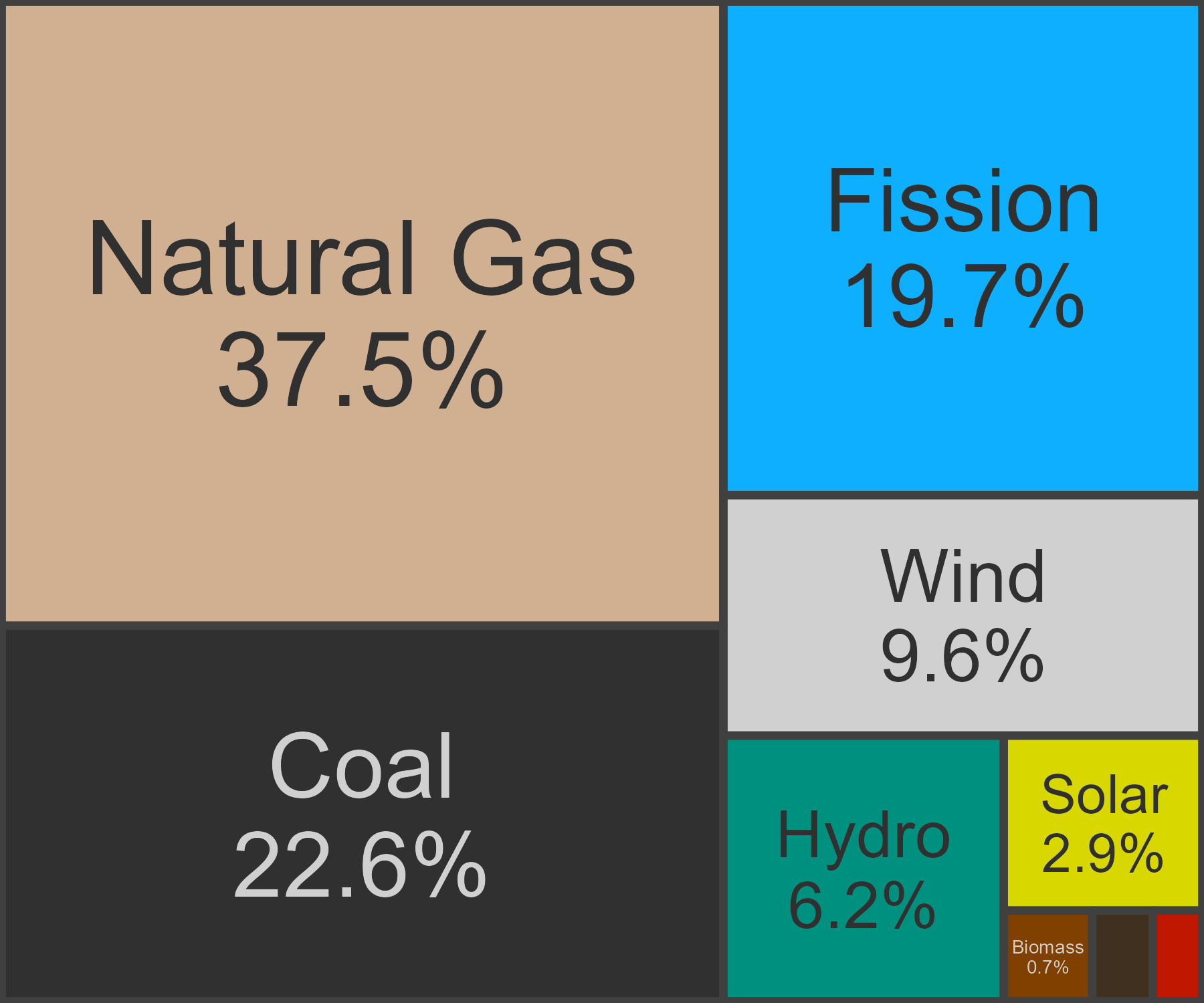
Generation by source

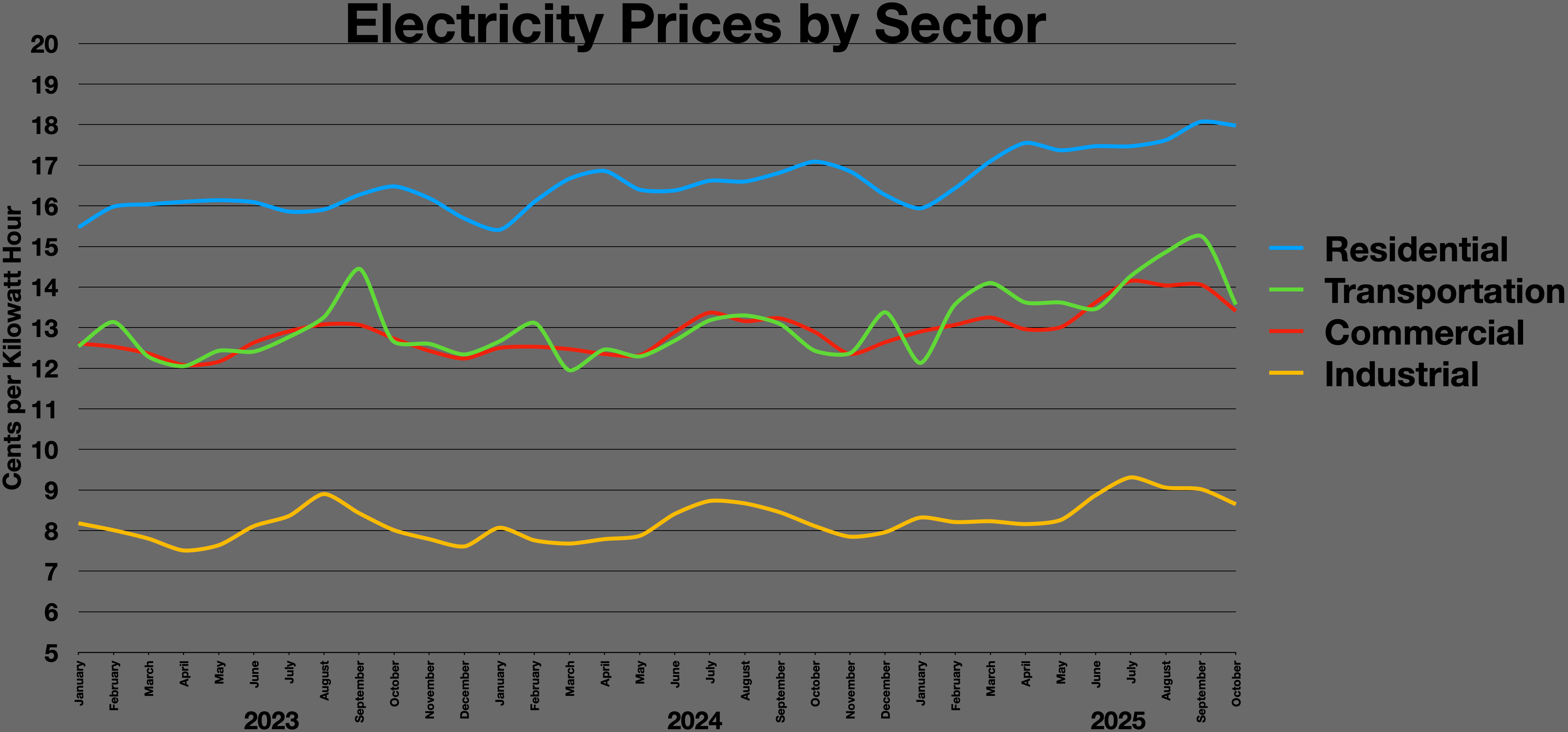
Electricity prices by sector in the United States

The United States is the world's second-largest producer and consumer of electricity. It generates 15% of the world's electricity supply, about half as much as China.

The United States produced 3,988 TWh in 2021. Total generation has been flat since 2010. Net electricity imports were 39 TWh, or about 1% of sales. Historically, net imports have been between just under 0% to just over 1.5%.

Fossil fuels made up the majority of generation, with natural gas providing 38% and coal 23%. Petroleum provided less than 1%. Natural gas as a proportion of fossil fuels has been increasing since the 90's, with coal peaking around 2008 and natural gas becoming the top fossil fuel in 2016.

Nuclear provided 20%, a level consistent since about 1990. Nuclear surpassed coal in 2020 for the first time, as coal dipped to its lowest proportion in over 70 years.

Among renewables, wind and solar continued to expand, with wind exceeding hydro since 2019. Renewable use has doubled from 2010 to 2020, reaching 21% of total generation.

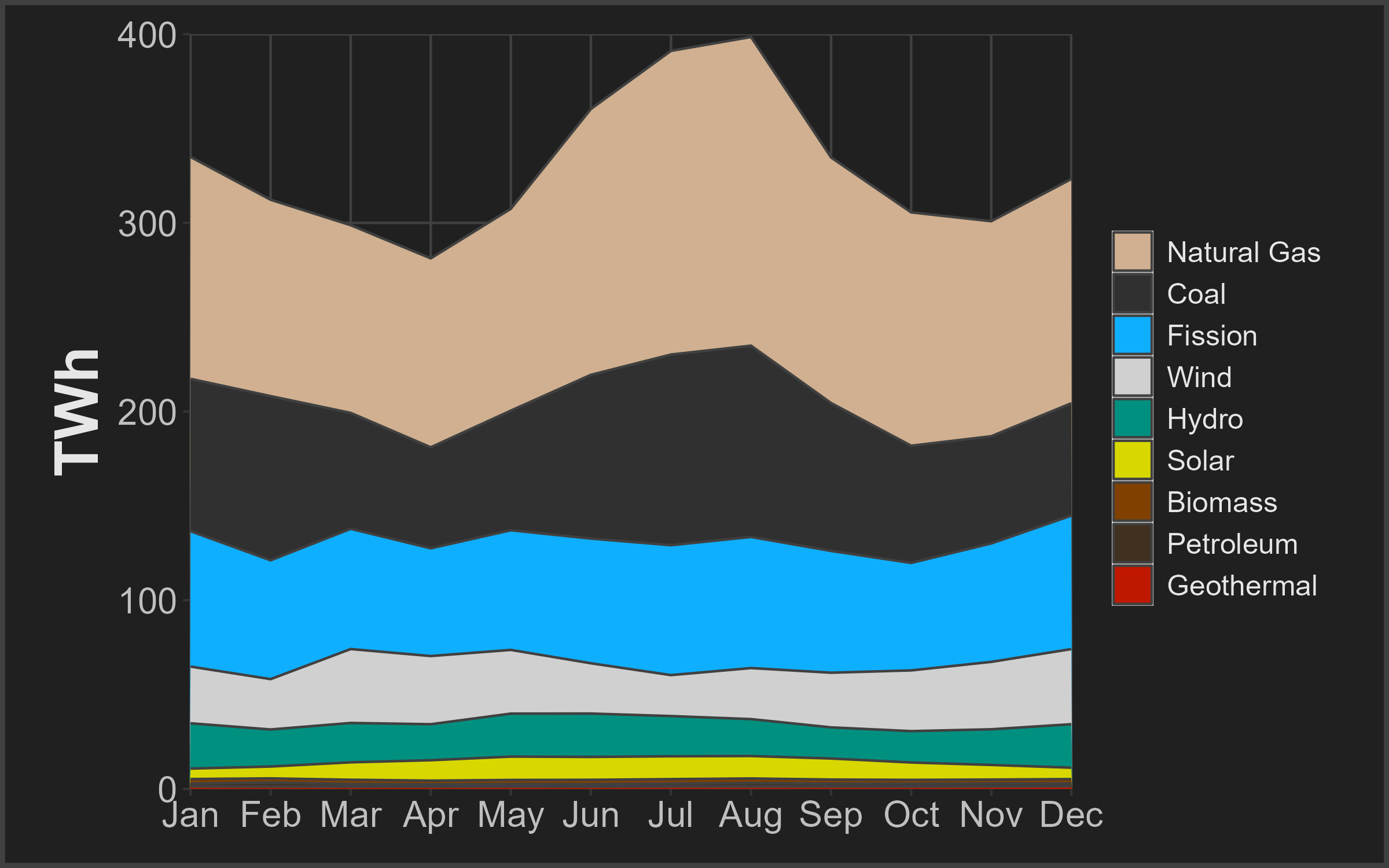
Monthly TWh by source

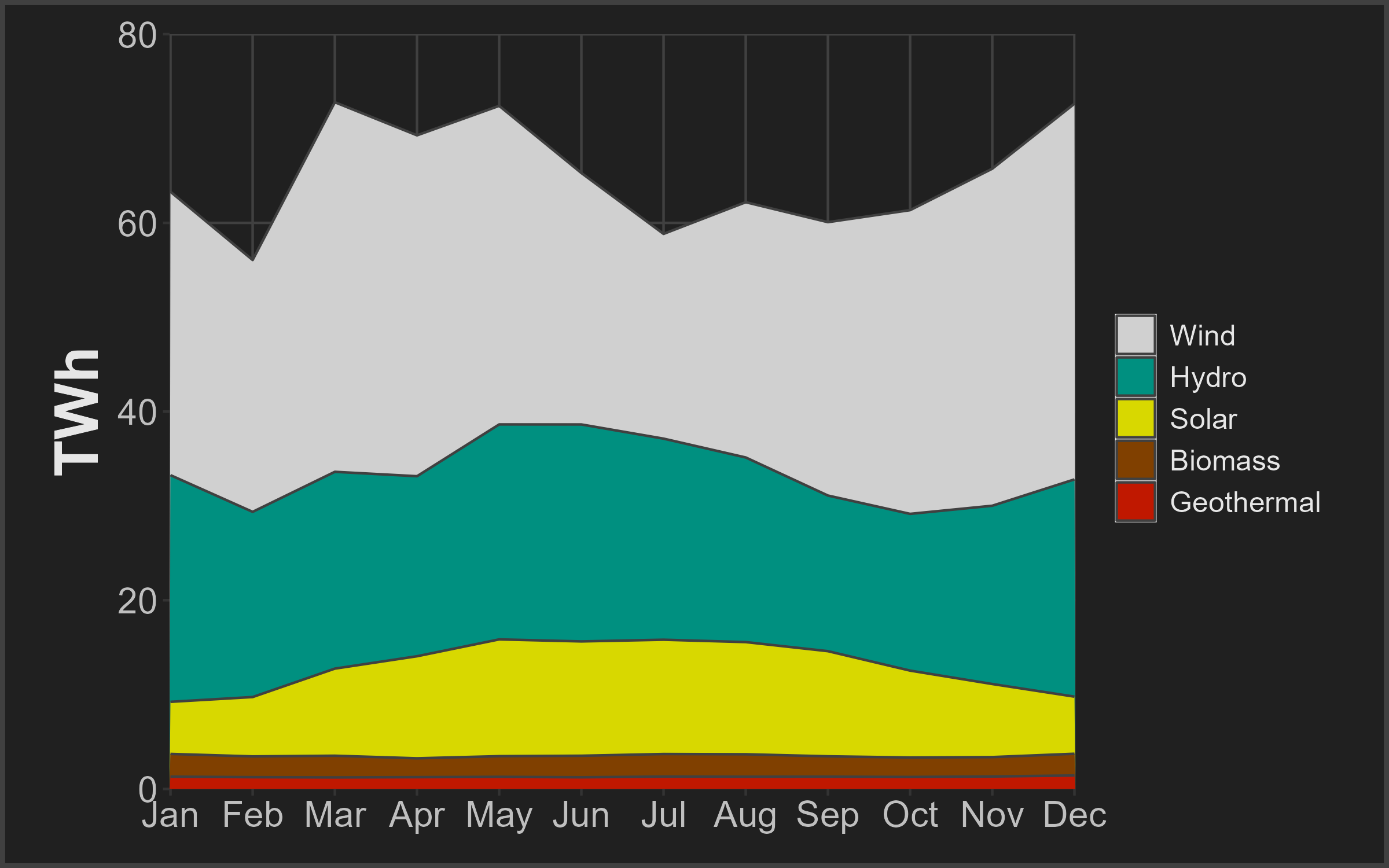
Monthly TWh by renewable source

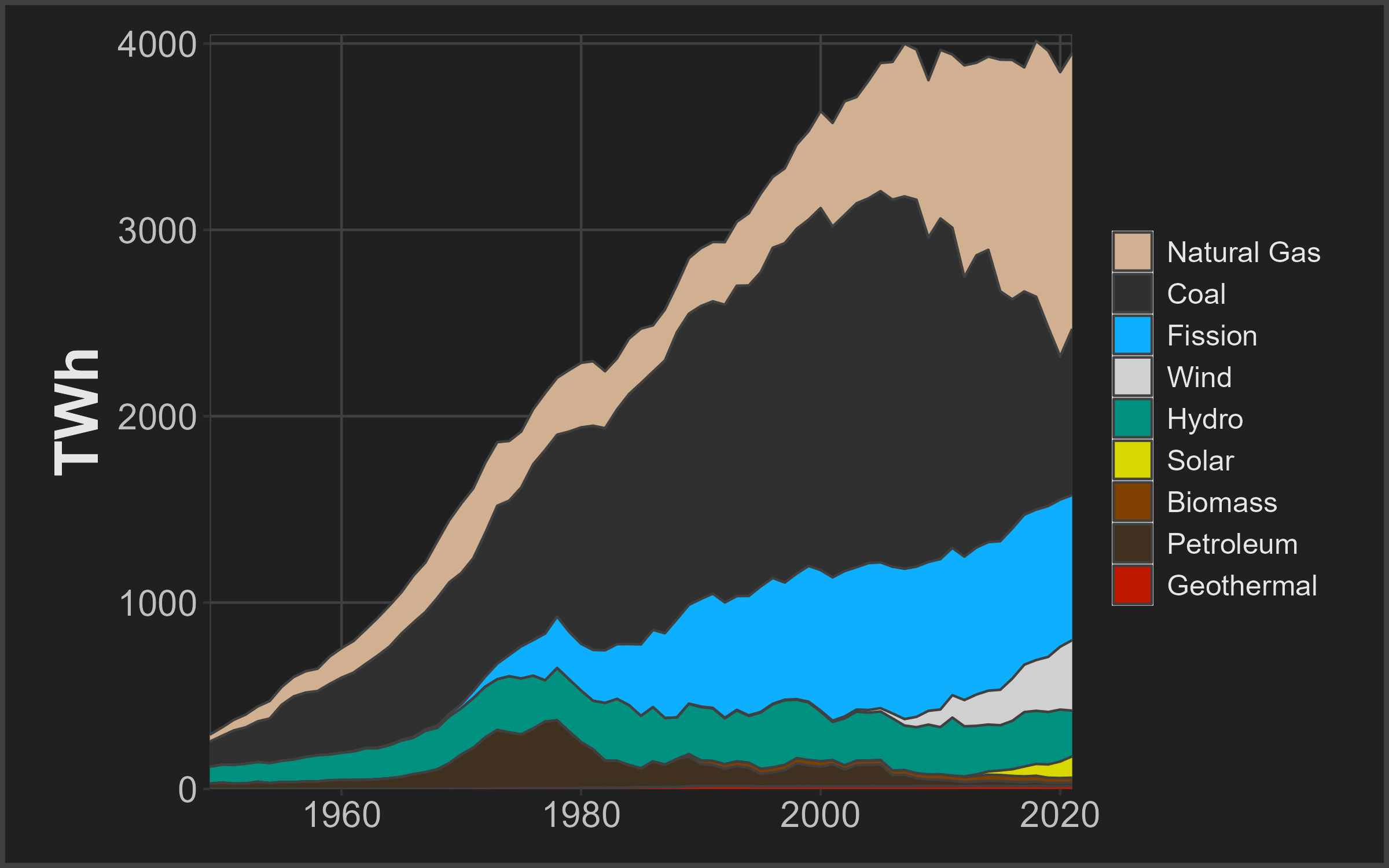
Yearly TWh by source

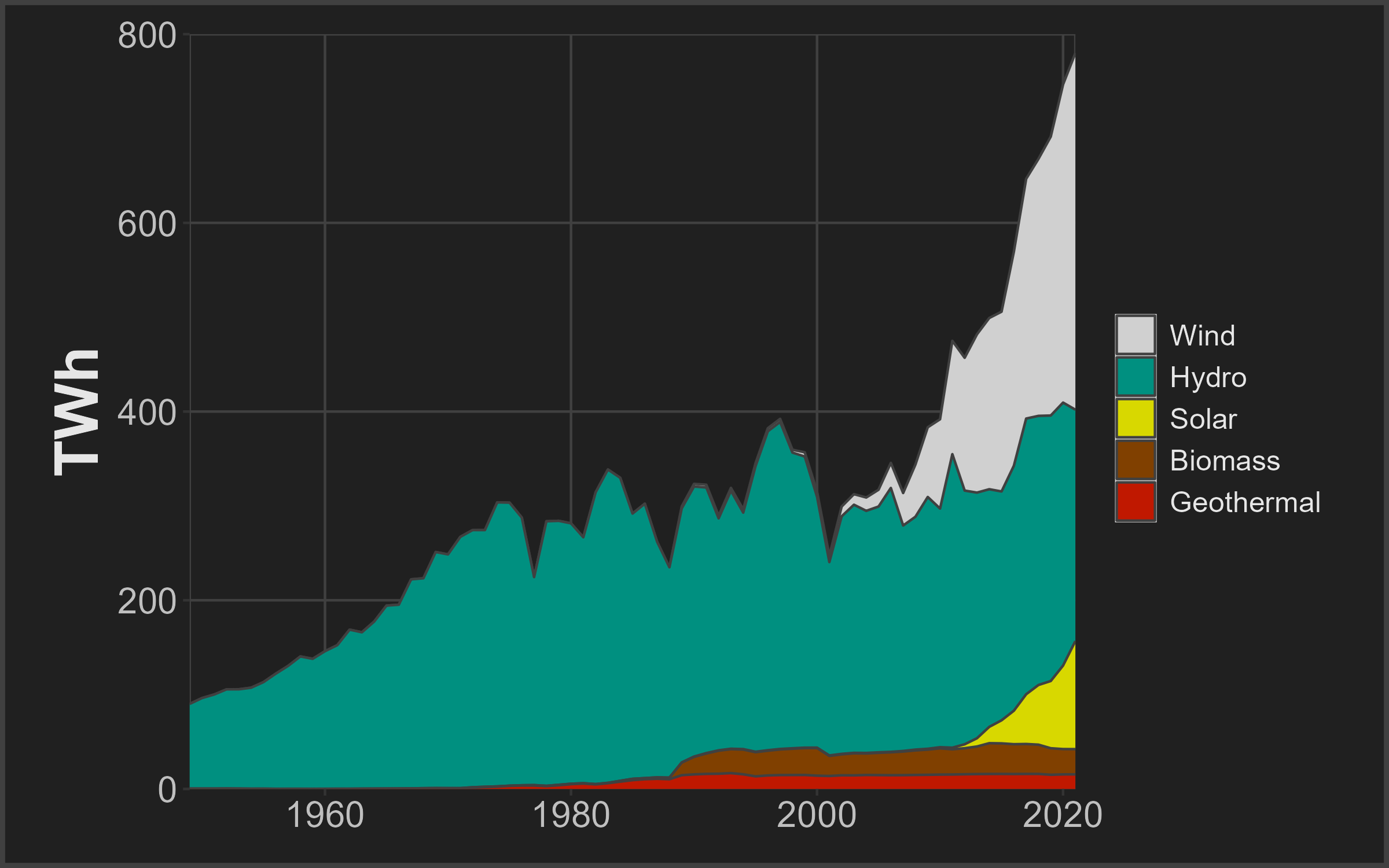
Yearly TWh by renewable source

=== Grid capacity ===
The United States had a nameplate generation capacity of 1,213 GW in 2021. The following table summarizes the electrical energy generated by fuel source for the United States grid in 2021. Figures account for generation losses, but not transmission losses. Fission had the highest capacity factor, while petroleum had the lowest.

The US grid first connected East and West in 1967. There are over 7,300 power plants and almost 160,000 miles of high voltage lines.

1 All	Biomass	Coal	Geothermal	Hydro
Natural gas	Nuclear	Petroleum	Solar	Wind

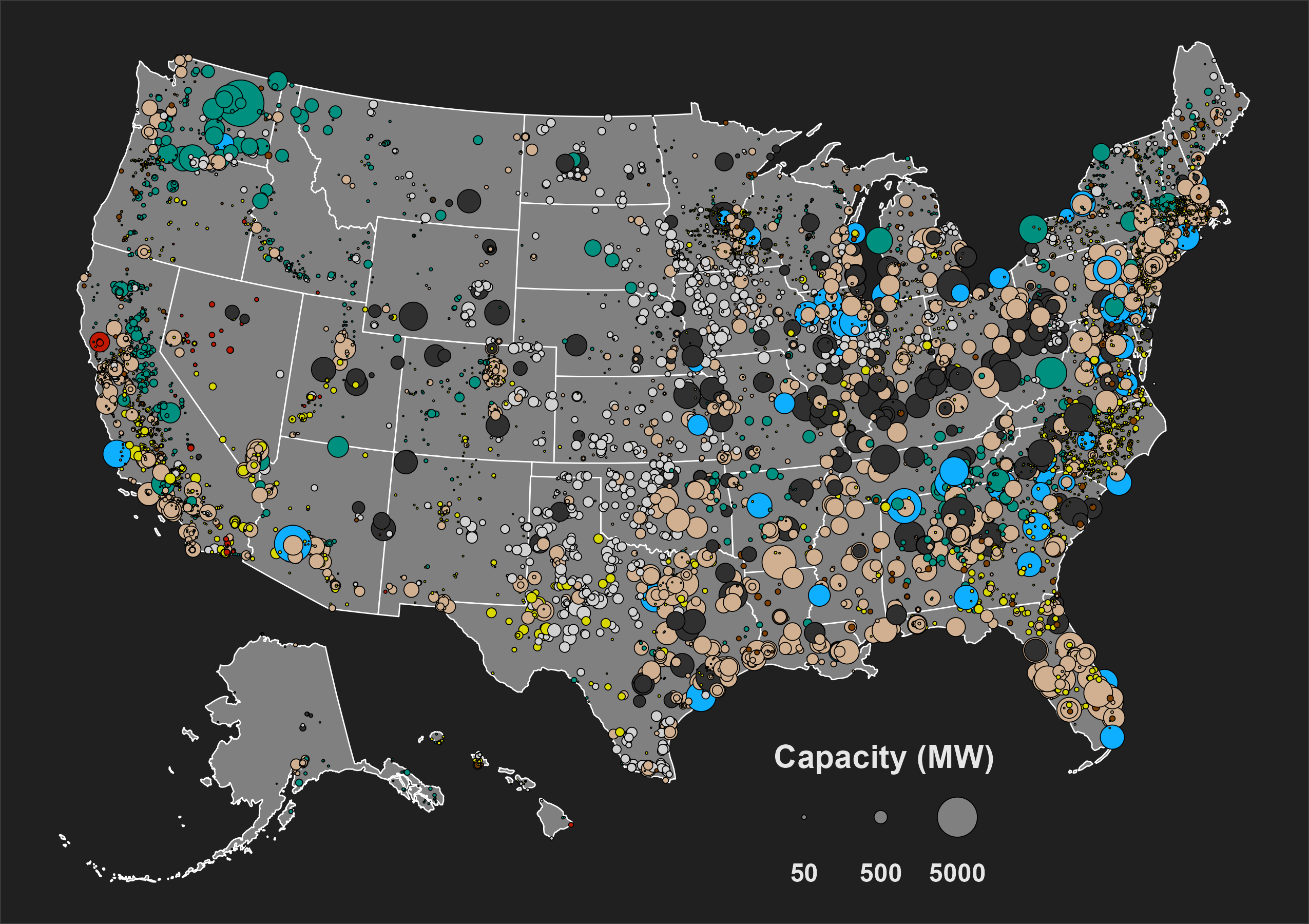
Electric plants by capacity

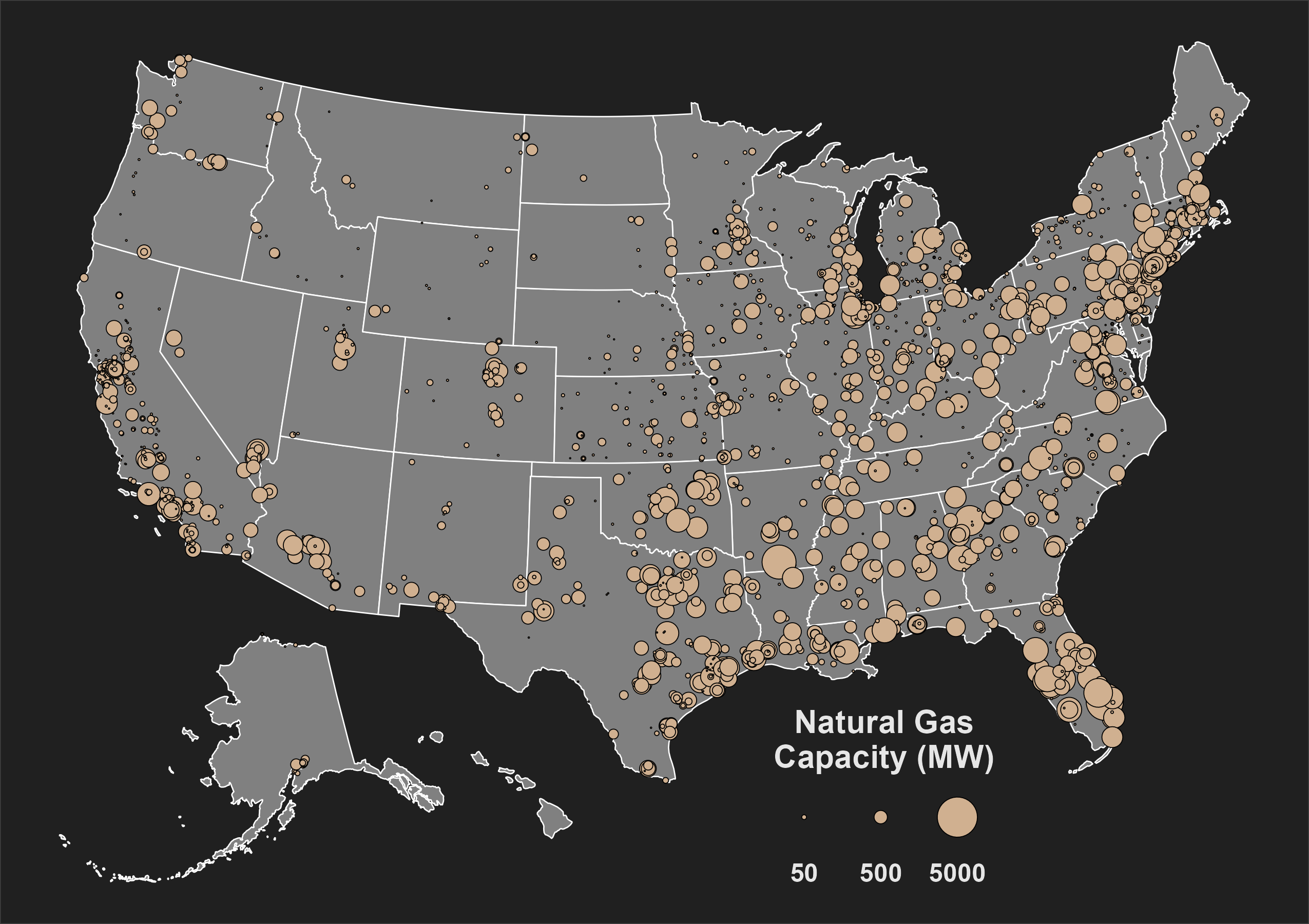
Natural gas plants by capacity

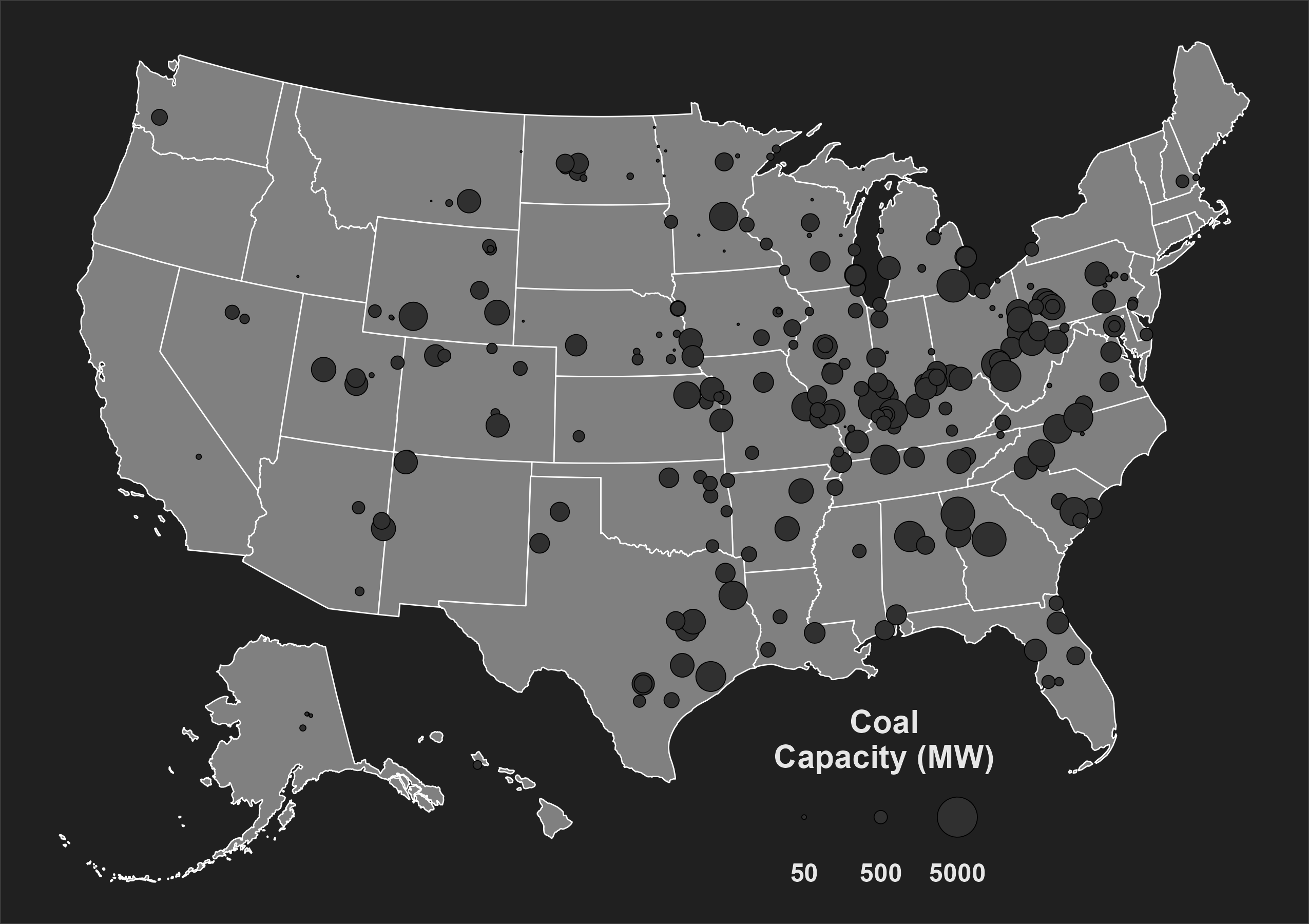
Coal plants by capacity

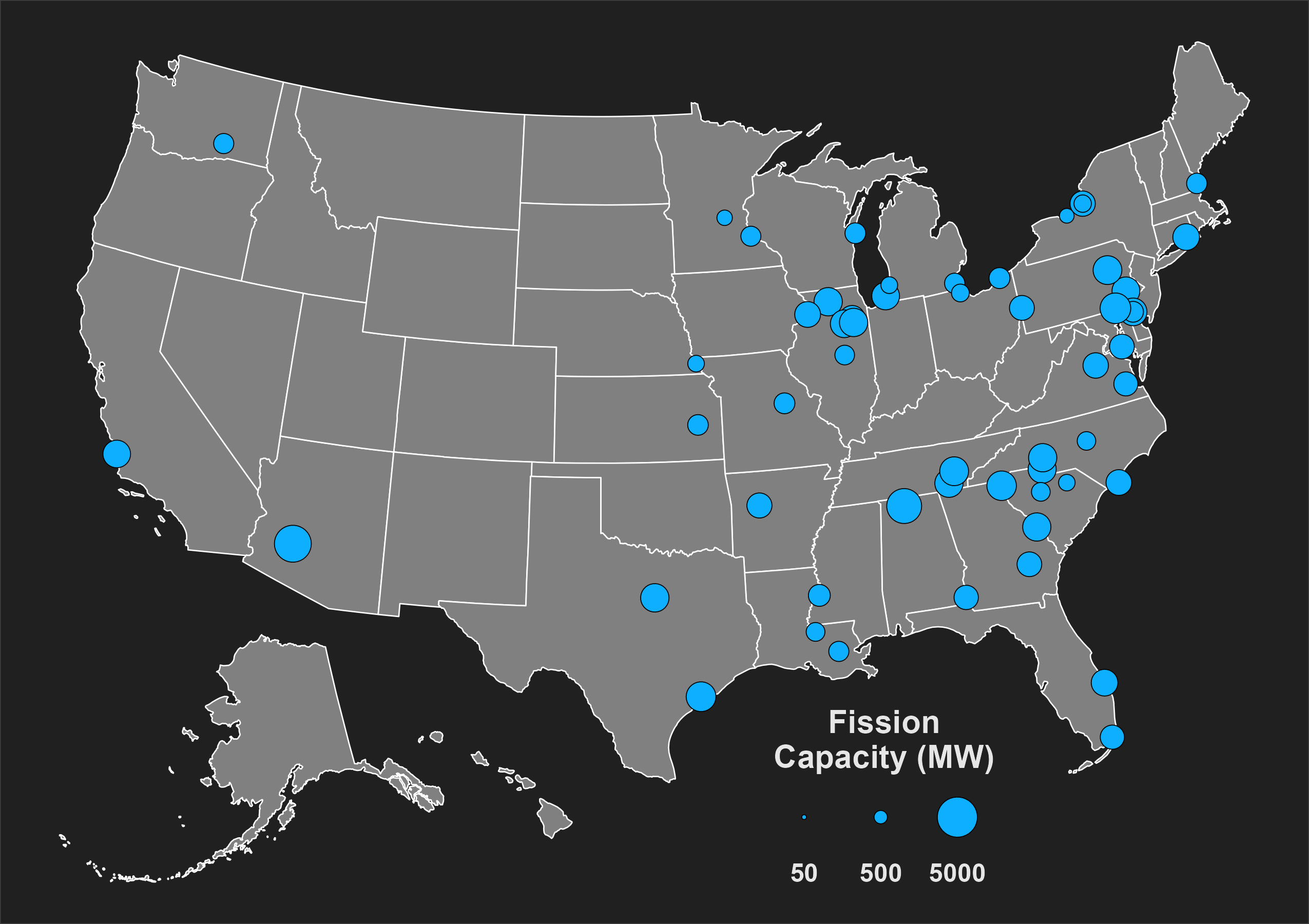
Nuclear plants by capacity

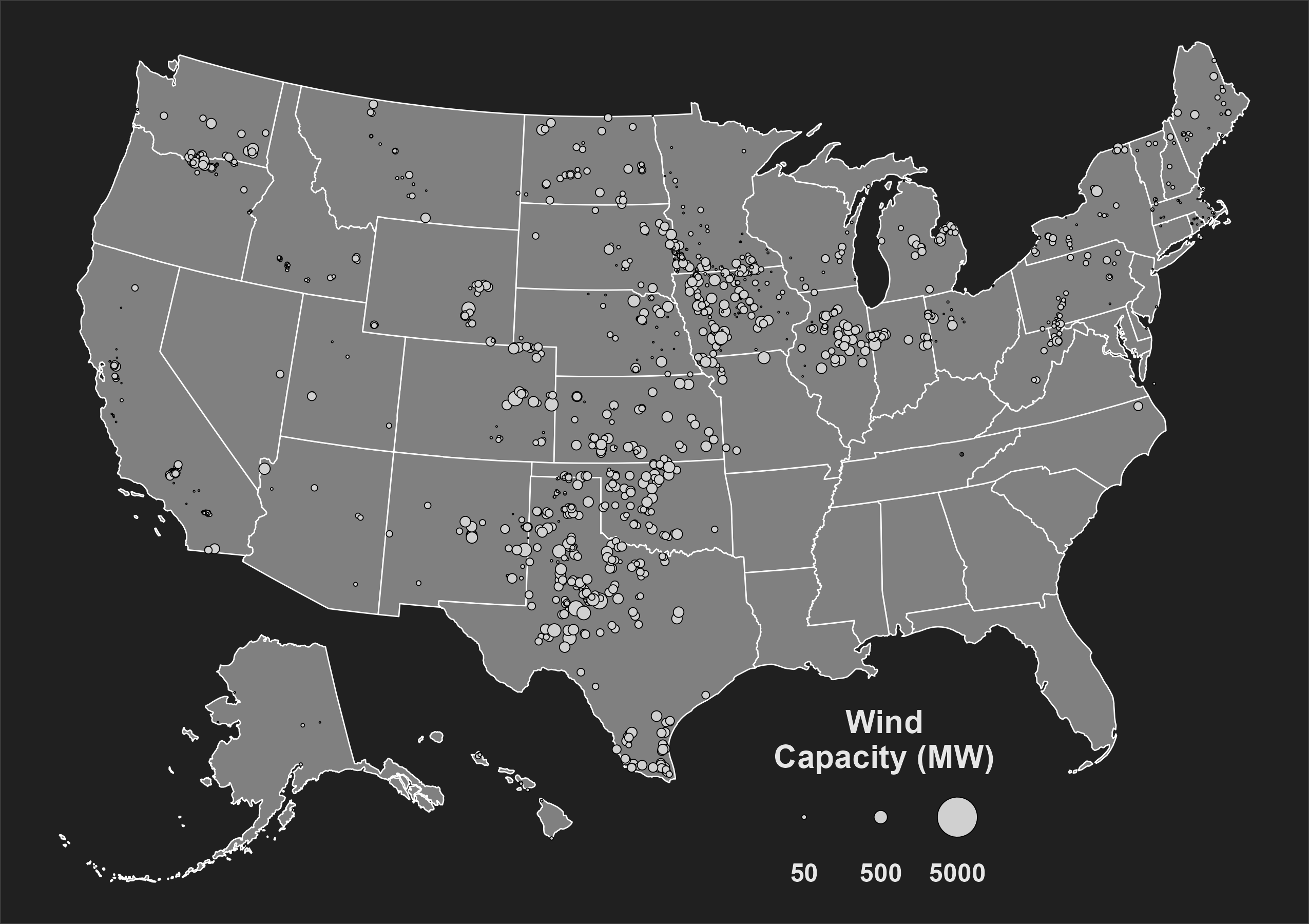
Wind plants by capacity

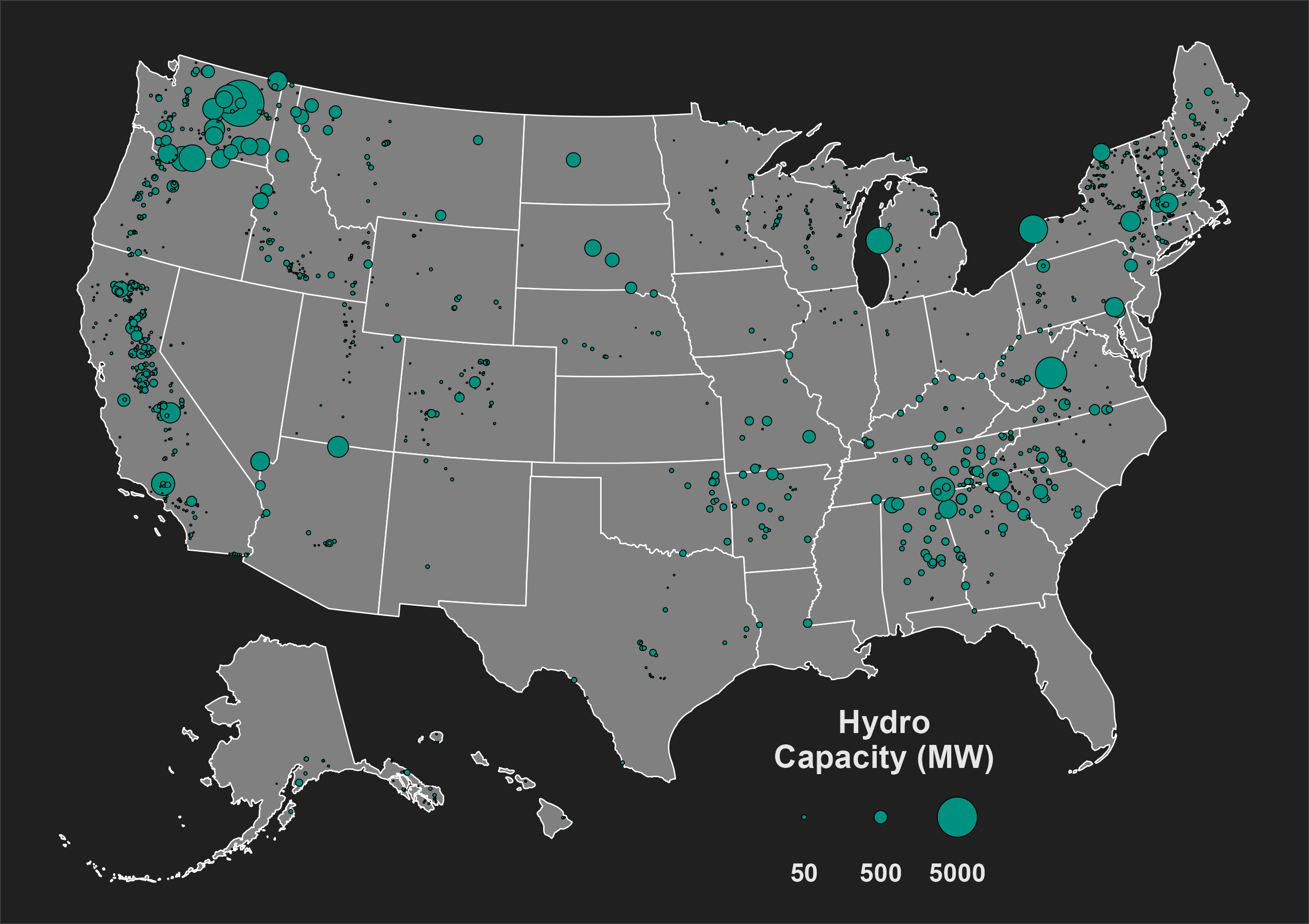
Hydro plants by capacity

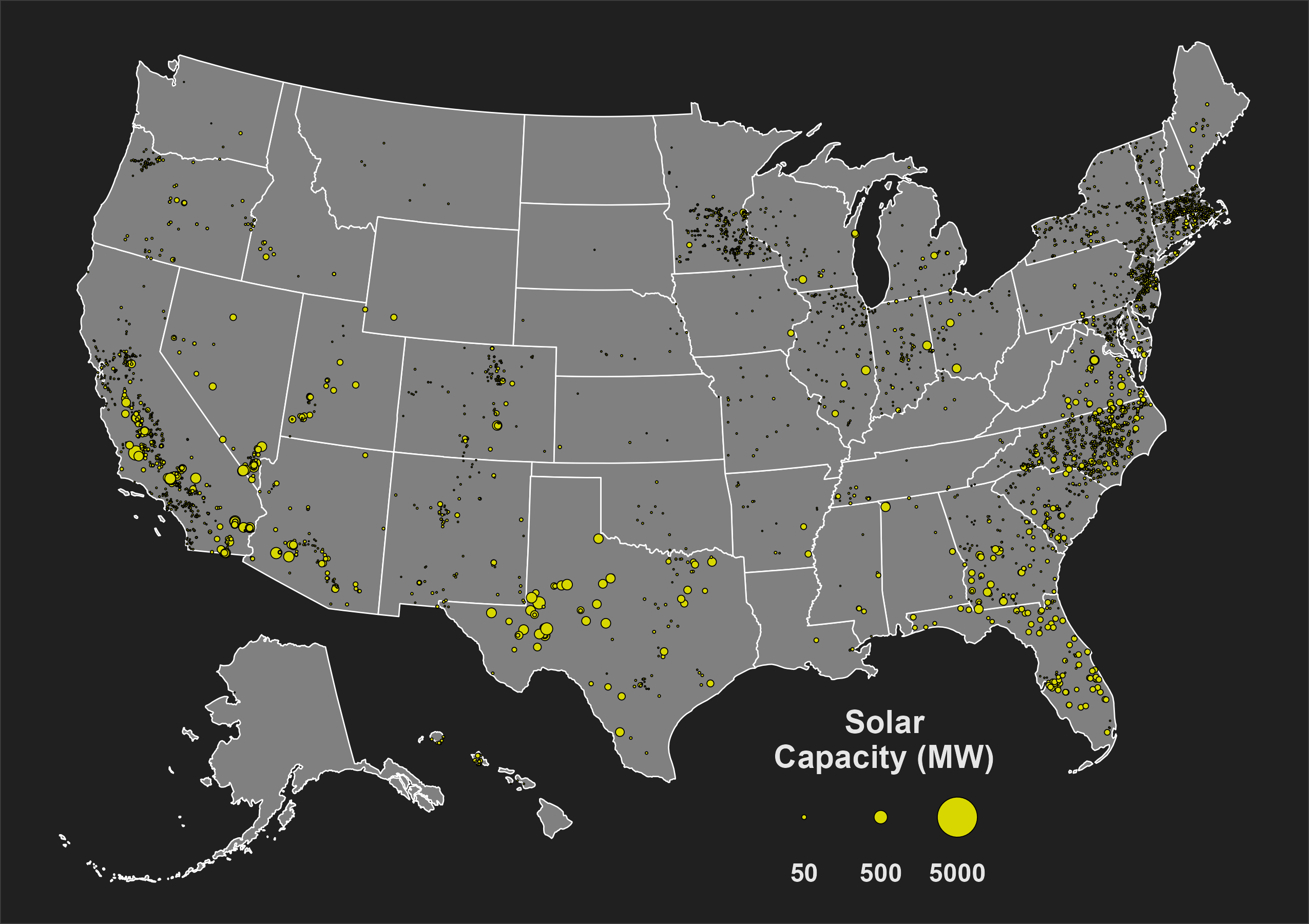
Solar plants by capacity

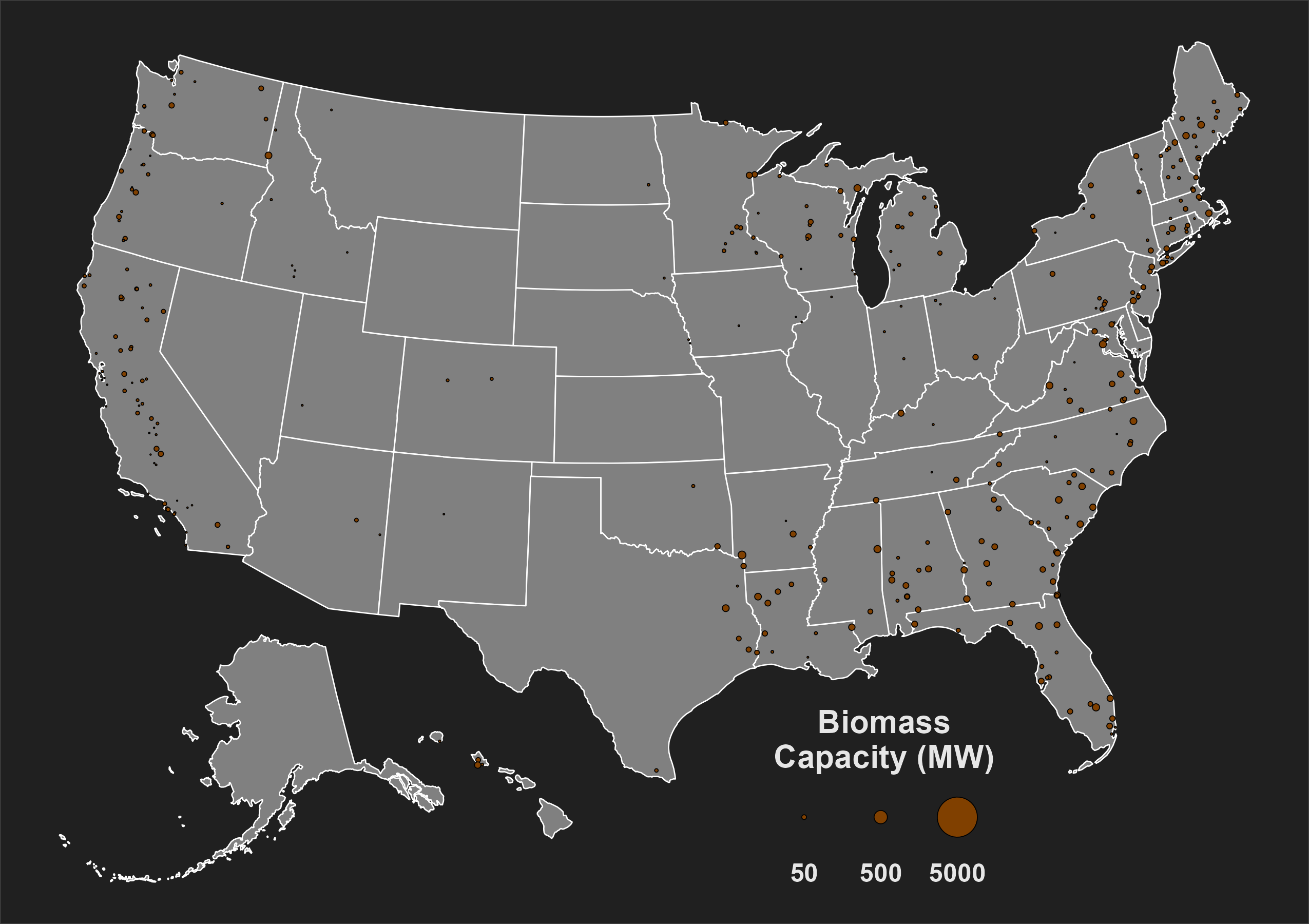
Biomass plants by capacity

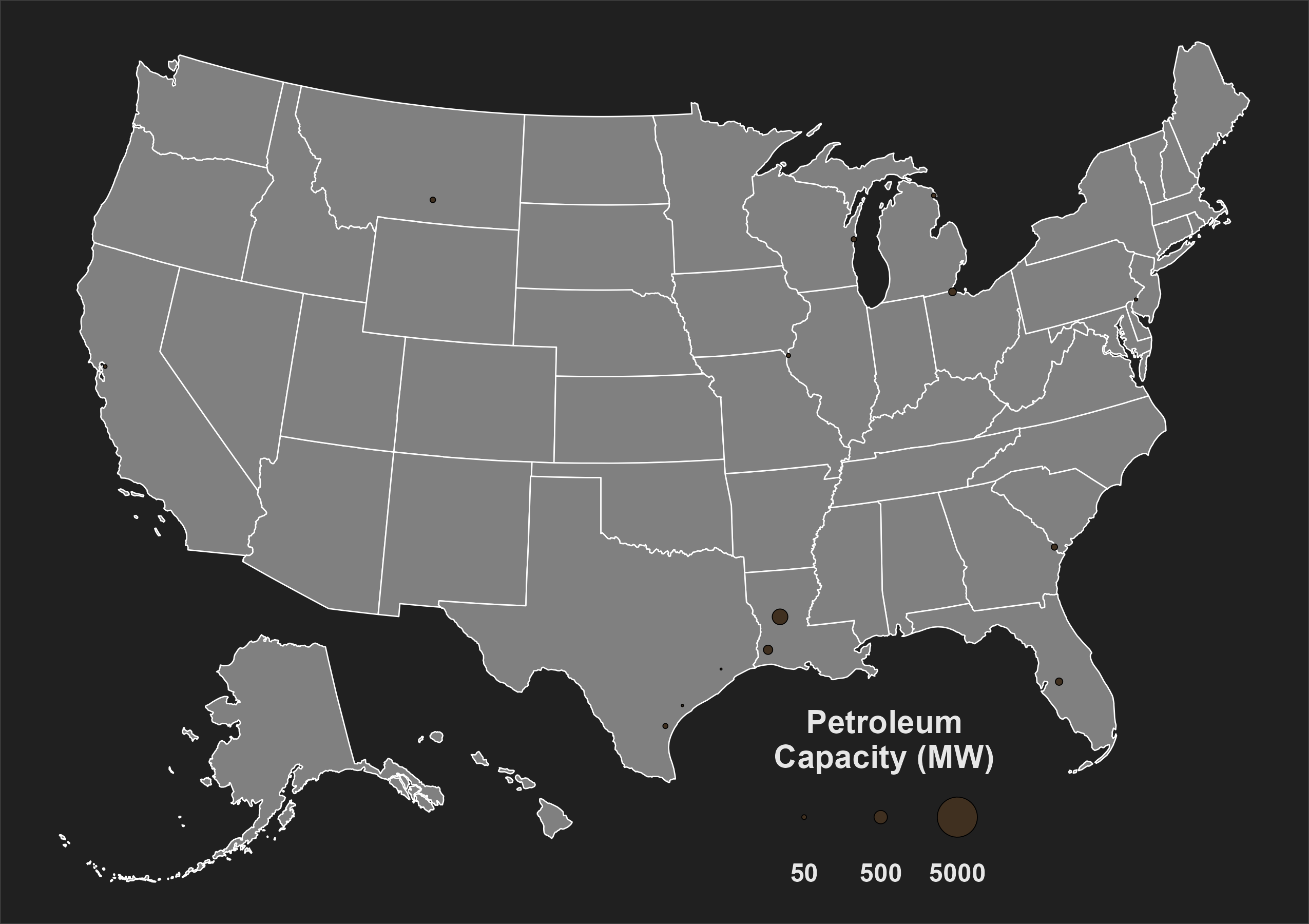
Petroleum plants by capacity

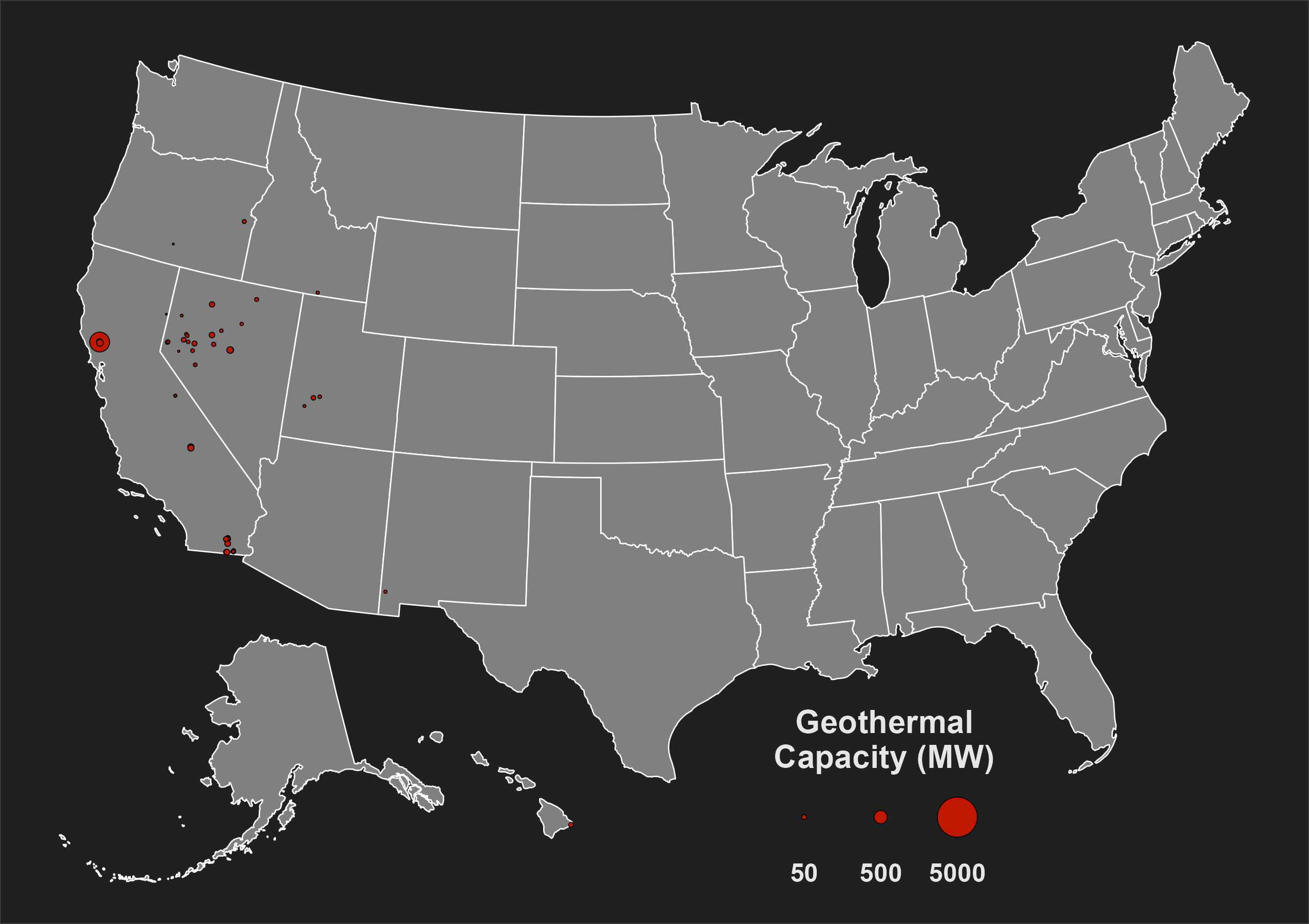
Geothermal plants by capacity

US electric grid capacity and generation in 2021
Source	Capacity (GW)	Generation (TWh)	Capacity factor
Total	1,213	3,988	37%
Natural gas	559.3	1480.1	30%
Coal	228.0	892.3	45%
Nuclear	100.0	778.2	89%
Wind	133.5	377.9	32%
Hydro	80.0	245.3	35%
Solar	61.9	114.5	21%
Petroleum	32.5	18.3	6%
Biomass	14.1	26.7	22%
Geothermal	3.9	15.5	45%

=== Generation by state ===
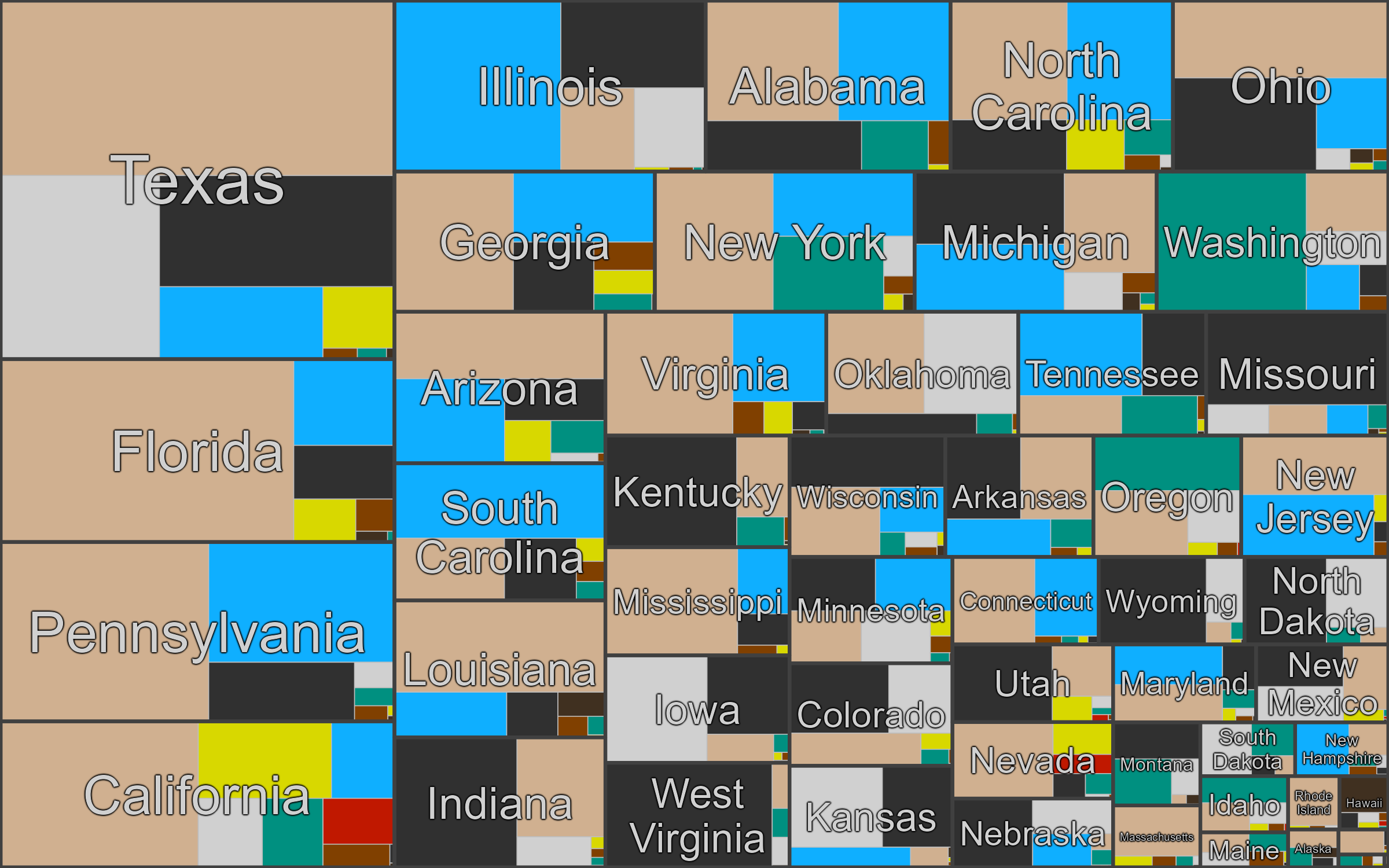
Generation by state and source

The following figures offer detail into the sources of generation used in each state. Most often, natural gas is the largest source in a given state, with 22 states using it more than any other. Among renewable sources, 18 states use wind power more than any other.

Though not always the most prominent source, each state will use at least one source at a rate above the national average. Twelve states use nuclear power more than average, and California and Hawaii each use more solar and petroleum, respectively.

Texas contributes more to the grid than any other state, followed by Florida, Pennsylvania and California. On net, Pennsylvania exports the most power, while California imports the most.

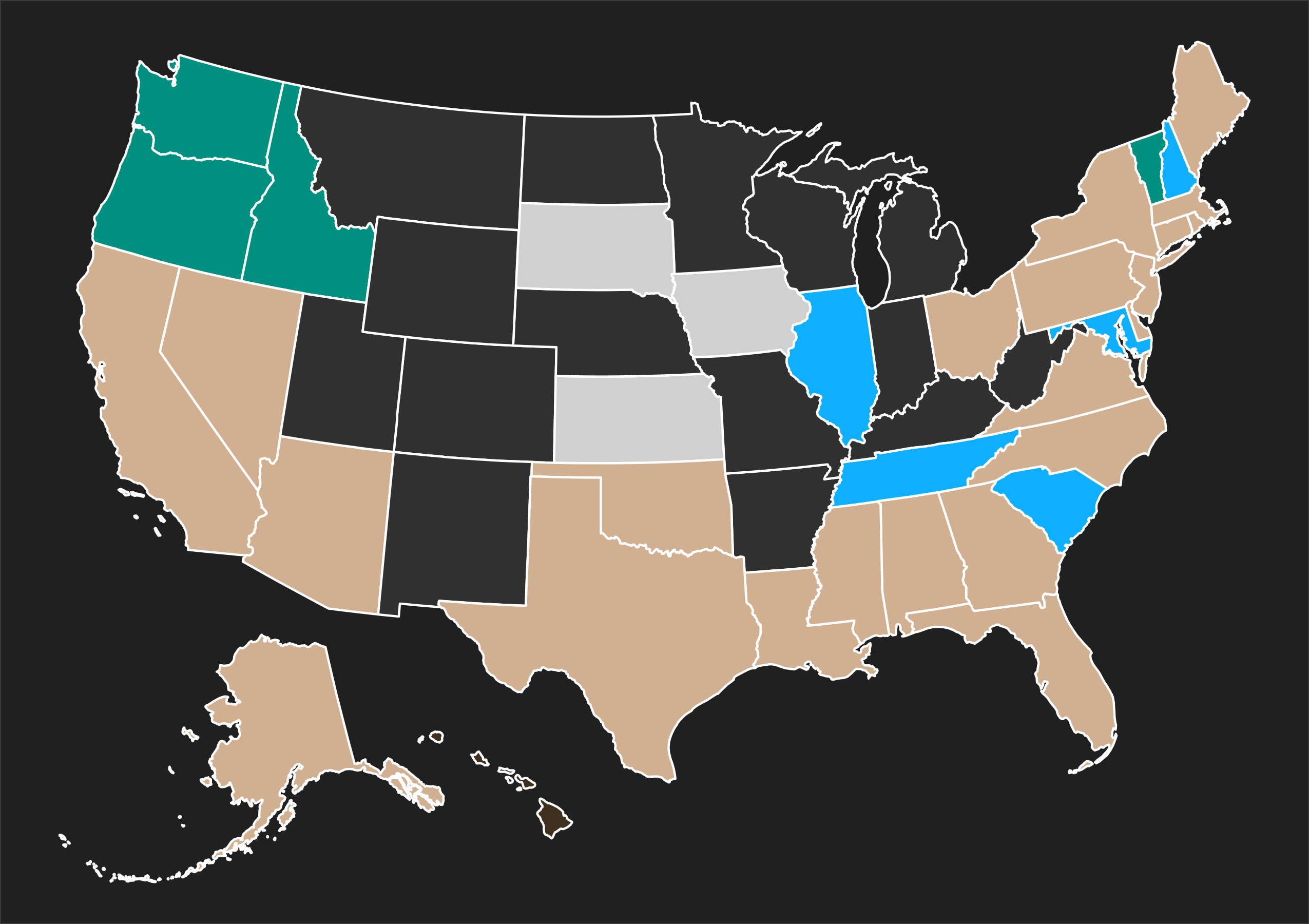
Largest generation source

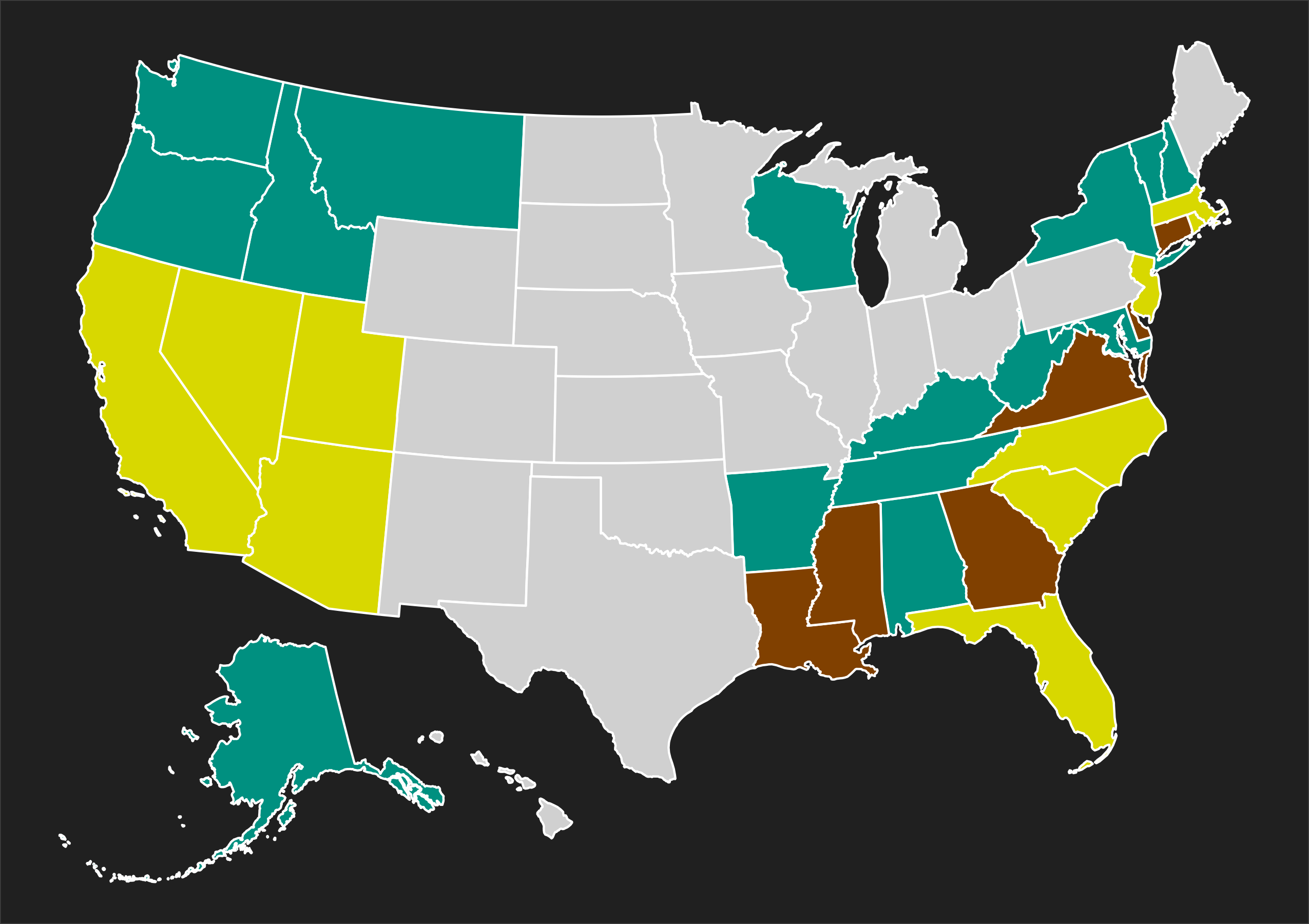
Largest renewable generation source

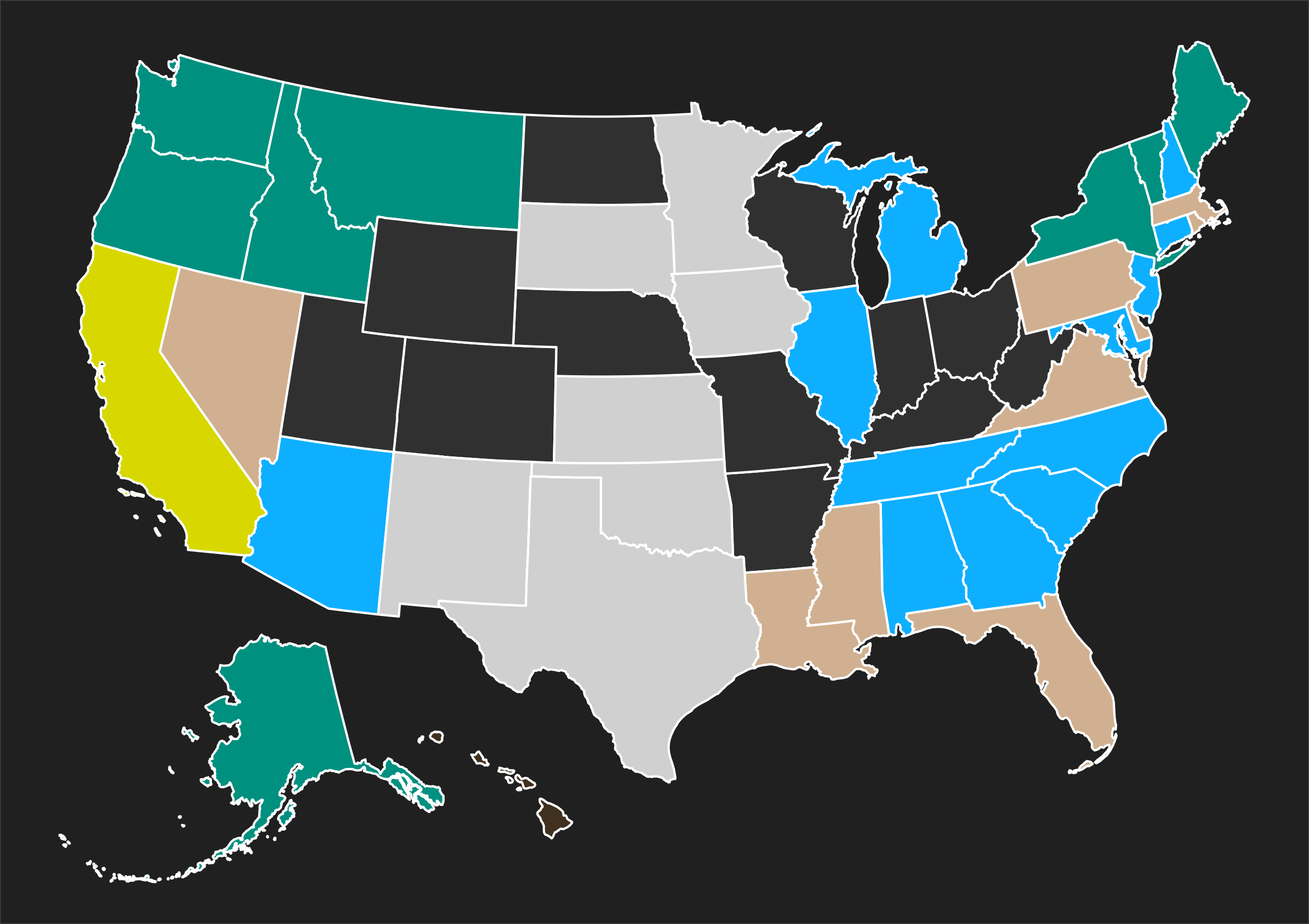
Most over-represented source

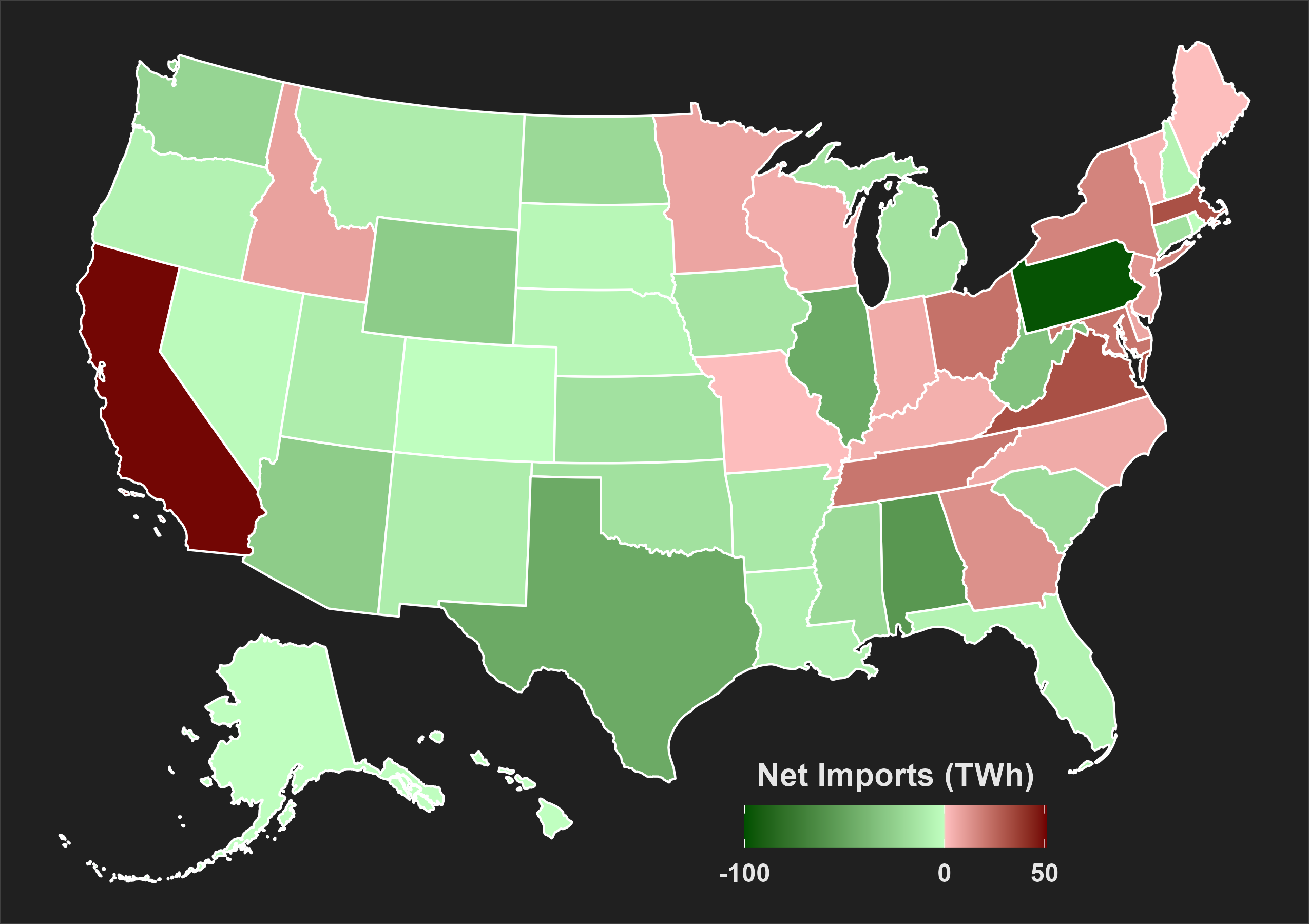
Net electricity imports/exports

=== Electric consumption ===
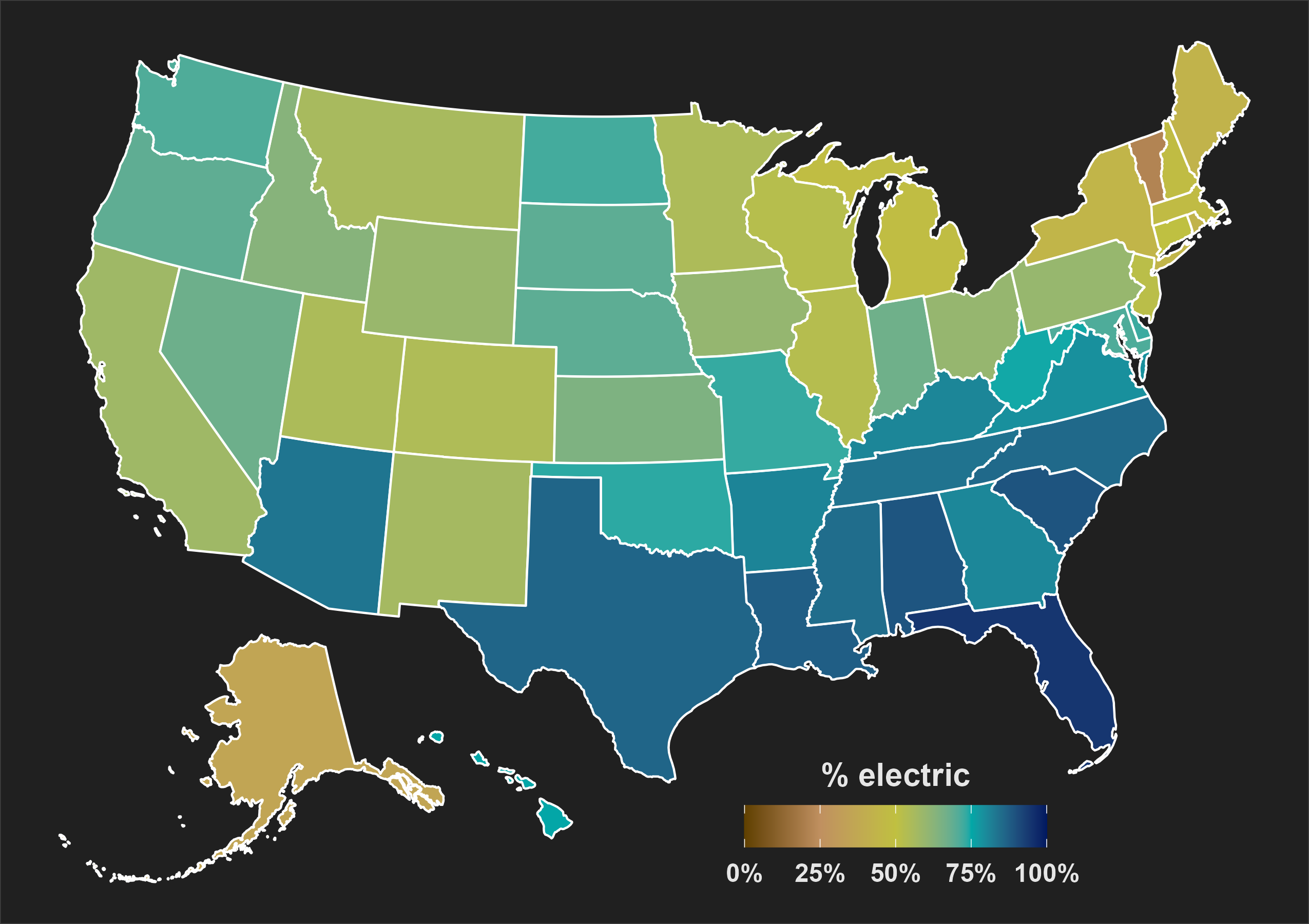
Home electrification

Electric grid consumption in the US was 3,806 TWh in 2021. Since 2010, total consumption has remained within 2% of this figure. Per capita consumption was 11.5 MWh in 2021, down 8% from its peak in 2007.

Residential customers used 39% of total electricity. Each month, the average customer used 886 kWh and paid $121 at an average rate of 13.7 cents/kWh. The commercial sector used 35% and industrial used 26%. Transportation used less than half of one percent.

System loss within the grid includes use in the generation process and transmission losses, as well as unaccounted loads. For 2021, this amounted to 203 TWh, or 5.3% of grid generation. Electricity used directly at the commercial or industrial level added 139 TWh, so total consumption was 3,945 TWh.

The northeastern US has long paid the highest electricity prices, while simultaneously using it the least per capita. California is an outlier in the west region; its neighbors tend to pay some of the lowest rates in the country, while California is second only to Hawaii and Alaska.

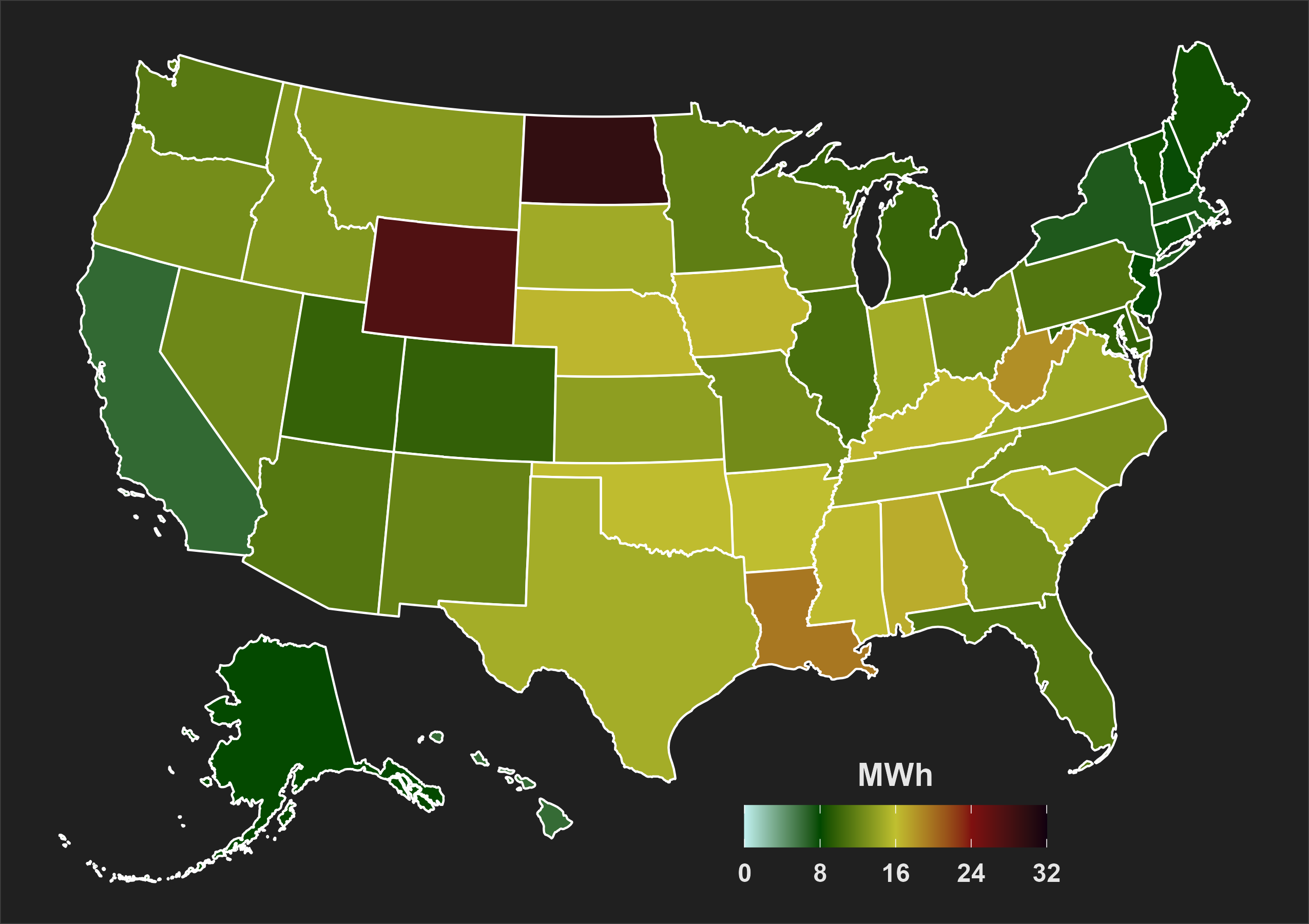
Overall use per capita

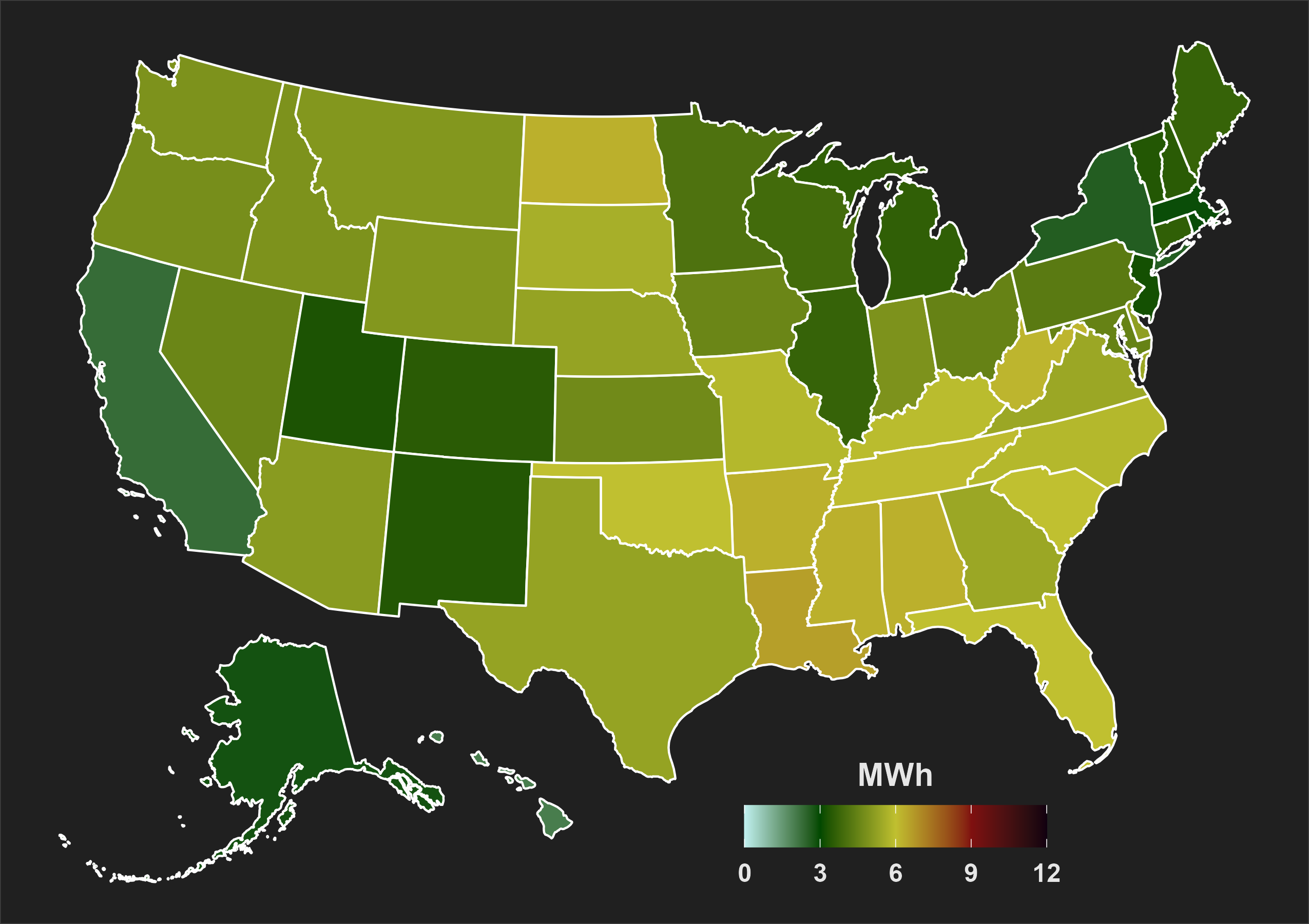
Home use per capita

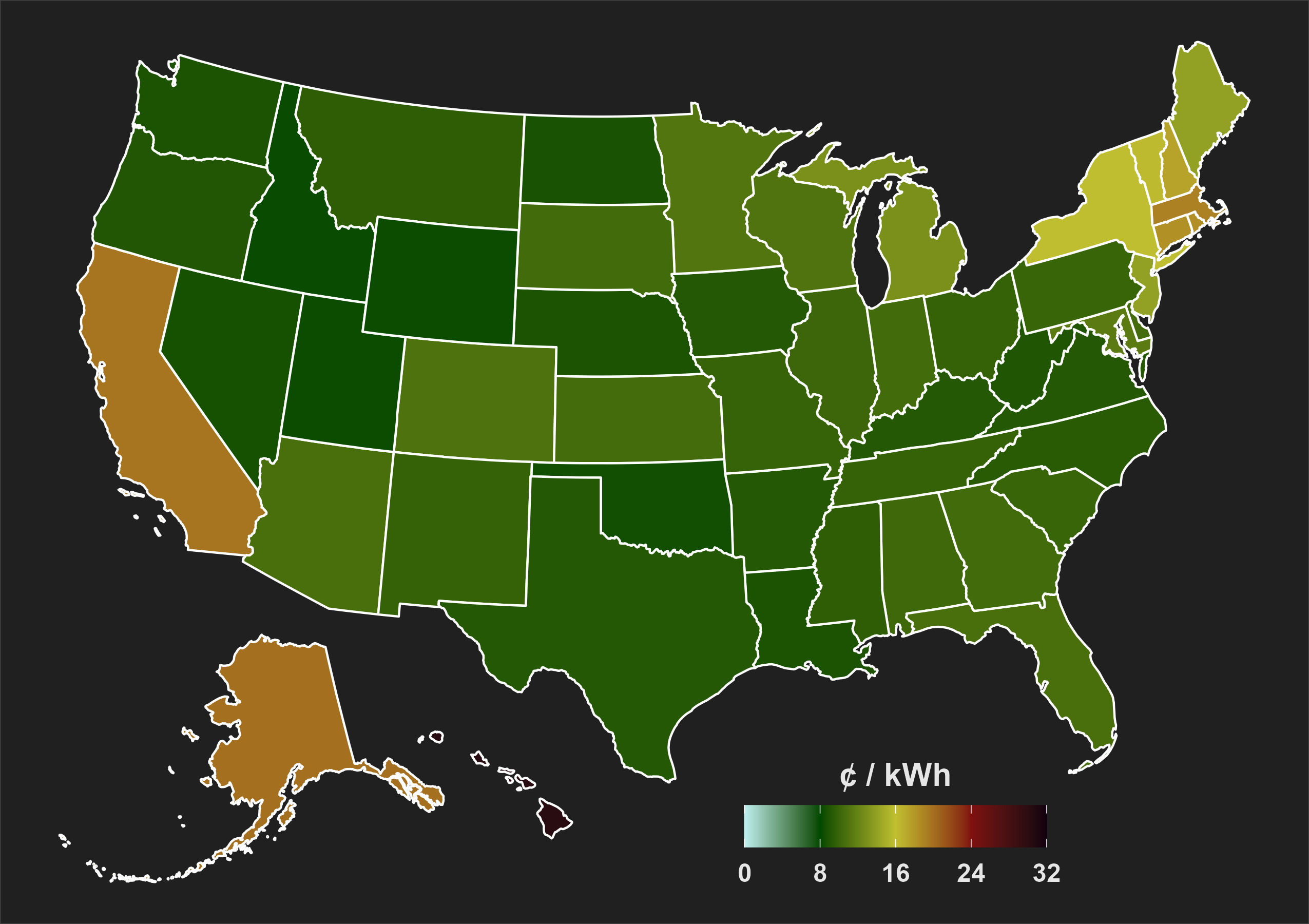
Overall price per kWh

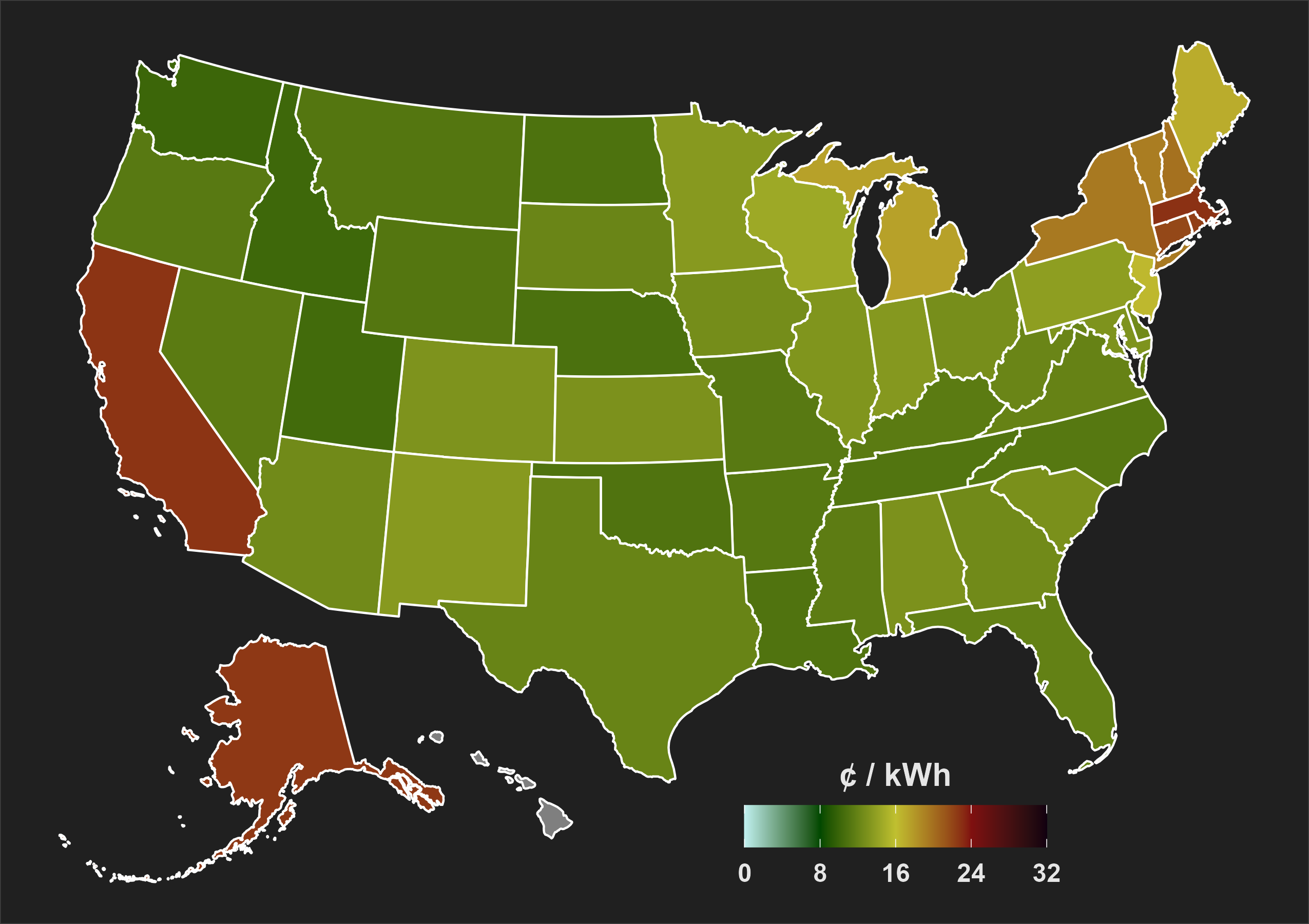
Home price per kWh

== See also ==
- Energy conservation in the United States
- Energy policy of the United States
- World energy resources
- World energy consumption
- List of countries by energy consumption and production
- List of U.S. states by electricity production from renewable sources
