= PECI =

Peci or PECI may refer to:

- Peci, a type of cap
- PECI (gene)
- Peći, Bosansko Grahovo, a village in Bosnia and Herzegovina
- Peći (Ključ), a village in Bosnia and Herzegovina
- Peći (Srebrenica), a village in Bosnia and Herzegovina
- Platform Environment Control Interface
- Portland Energy Conservation

== People ==
- Aleksandër Peçi (born 1951), Albanian composer
- Sotir Peçi (1873–1932), Albanian politician
- Faton Peci
- József Pecsovszky (1921–1968), Romanian footballer
