= Inflation Reduction Act =

2022 American budget reconciliation law

Inflation Reduction Act of 2022
- Long title: To provide for reconciliation pursuant to title II of S. Con. Res. 14.
- Acronyms (colloquial): IRA
- Enacted by: the 117th United States Congress
- Effective: August 16, 2022

Citations
- Public law: Pub. L. 117–169 (text) (PDF)
- Statutes at Large: 136 Stat. 1818

Legislative history
- Introduced in the House as the "Build Back Better Act" (H.R. 5376) by John Yarmuth (D–KY) on September 27, 2021; Committee consideration by House Budget Committee; Passed the House on November 19, 2021 (220–213); Passed the Senate as the "Inflation Reduction Act of 2022" on August 7, 2022 (51–50) with amendment; House agreed to Senate amendment on August 12, 2022 (220–207); Signed into law by President Joe Biden on August 16, 2022

Major amendments
- Fiscal Responsibility Act of 2023; One Big Beautiful Bill Act

The Inflation Reduction Act of 2022 (IRA), Pub. L. 117–169 (text) (PDF), is a United States federal law which aimed to reduce the federal government budget deficit, lower prescription drug prices, and invest in domestic energy production while promoting renewable energy. It was passed by the 117th United States Congress and signed into law by President Joe Biden on August 16, 2022.

It is a budget reconciliation bill sponsored by senators Chuck Schumer (D-NY) and Joe Manchin (D-WV). The bill was the result of negotiations on the proposed Build Back Better Act, which was reduced and comprehensively reworked from its initial proposal after being opposed by Manchin. It was introduced as an amendment to the Build Back Better Act and the legislative text was substituted. All Democrats in the Senate and House voted for the bill while all voting Republicans voted against it. It was described as a landmark piece of legislation.

According to the nonpartisan Congressional Budget Office (CBO) and Joint Committee on Taxation (JCT), the law will raise $738 billion from tax reform and prescription drug reform to lower prices, as well as authorize $891 billion in total spending – including $391 billion on energy and climate change, and $64 billion on three years of Affordable Care Act subsidies. It represents the largest investment towards addressing greenhouse gas emissions in United States history. It also includes a large expansion of the Internal Revenue Service (IRS), including the hiring of up to 87,000 new employees to replace tens of thousands of recent departures, which led to over $1 billion being collected in past-due taxes from millionaires and other high-wealth individuals by July 2024. (Note: A portion of the new IRS funding was rescinded in the Fiscal Responsibility Act of 2023.)

The act is generally not believed to have reduced inflation in 2022 and 2023, although some economists predict the renewable energy investments will bring down inflation in the medium-to-long term.

In 2026, the first group of 10 high-cost drugs selected by Medicare will have their negotiated prices take effect.

== Background ==
The Build Back Better Plan was a legislative framework proposed by United States president Joe Biden between 2020 and 2021. Generally viewed as ambitious in size and scope, it sought to make the largest nationwide public investments in social, infrastructural, and environmental programs since the 1930s Great Depression-fighting policies of the New Deal.

The plan was divided into three parts: one of them, the American Rescue Plan, a COVID-19 relief spending bill, was signed into law in March 2021. The other two parts were reworked into different bills over the course of extensive negotiations within and among Congressional entities. The American Jobs Plan (AJP) was a proposal to address long-neglected infrastructure needs and reduce America's contributions to climate change's destructive effects; the American Families Plan (AFP) was a proposal to fund a variety of social policy initiatives, some of which (e.g. paid family leave) had never before been enacted nationally in the U.S.

The Build Back Better Act was a bill introduced in the 117th Congress to fulfill aspects of the Build Back Better Plan. It was spun off from the American Jobs Plan, alongside the Infrastructure Investment and Jobs Act, as a $3.5 trillion Democratic reconciliation package that included provisions related to climate change in the United States (centered around Senator Ron Wyden's technology-neutral, tax incentive-first approach) and social policy, lowered to approximately $2.2 trillion. The bill was passed 220–213 by the House of Representatives on November 19, 2021.

In December 2021, amidst negotiations and parliamentary procedures, Senator Joe Manchin publicly pulled his support from the bill citing its cost and a too-aggressive transition to clean energy, then retracted support for his own compromise legislation. This effectively killed the bill as it needed 50 senators to pass via reconciliation, and all 50 Republican senators opposed it.

In the summer of 2022, Manchin and Senate majority leader Chuck Schumer engaged in negotiations over a revised reconciliation bill with about $1 trillion in revenue from tax reform, $500 billion in climate and health care spending, and $500 billion in deficit reduction. However, Manchin announced abruptly on July 14, 2022 that he would not support new climate spending or tax reform due to his fear that the bill would worsen inflation. He later stated that he would be open to revisiting those elements a few months later, provided that inflation slowed meaningfully. Biden nonetheless conceded defeat on a climate bill, urging Congress to pass whatever Manchin would agree to (a slim, $280 billion health care bill that would acquire its revenue from allowing Medicare to negotiate prices and spend $40 billion on Affordable Care Act subsidies).

Unbeknownst to nearly everyone in Washington, Manchin and Schumer reengaged in secret negotiations on July 18, 2022. On July 27, hours after the Senate passed the CHIPS and Science Act, the two men released a statement announcing the $891 billion Inflation Reduction Act of 2022, which included climate spending and tax reform.

The sudden deal was widely regarded as a "shocker", as Democrats had voiced little hope for a revival of their climate and tax priorities, in addition to Manchin himself being rather pessimistic on the prospect of an expanded bill.

As the revised bill made its way through the chambers of Congress, the new reality of Biden unexpectedly having a clear path to enacting substantial portions of his domestic agenda into law led to a wide reevaluation of the success of the Biden presidency thus far and was expected to give the president and his party a boost in the 2022 midterm elections.

== Legislative history ==
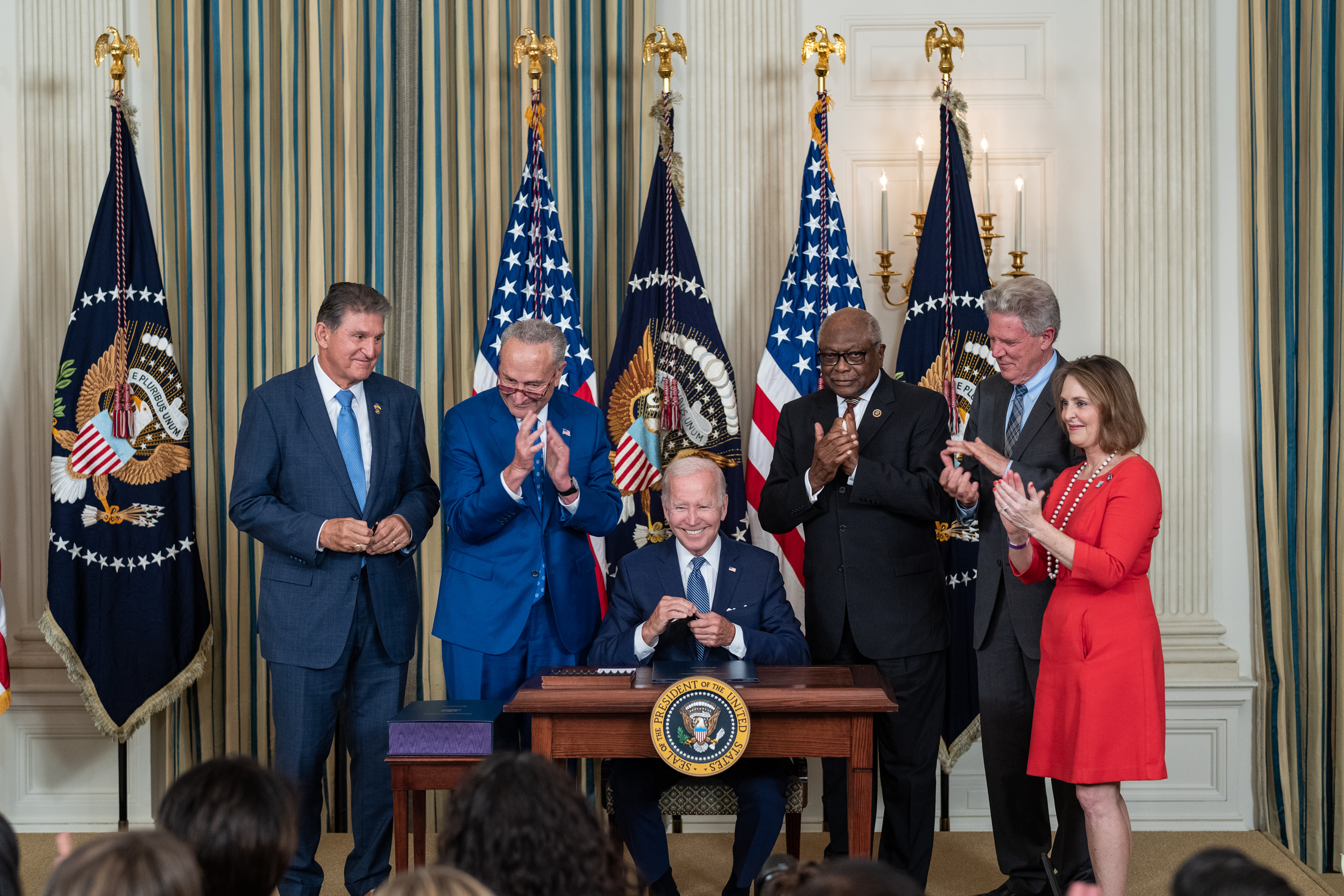
President Joe Biden signing the bill into law in the State Dining Room of the White House on August 16, 2022. (L-R) Senator Joe Manchin (D-WV), Senate majority leader Chuck Schumer (D-NY), Rep. Jim Clyburn (D-SC), Rep. Frank Pallone (D-NJ), and Rep. Kathy Castor (D-FL).

The Build Back Better Act, which passed the House on September 27, 2021, was used by the Senate as the legislative vehicle for this legislation. On August 6, 2022, Senate majority leader Chuck Schumer proposed an amendment which would replace the text of the previously passed bill with the text of the Inflation Reduction Act of 2022. This substitute amendment was later adopted.

Schumer's lead staffer, Gerry Petrella, recalled the surprise phone call came from Senator Joe Manchin's office just prior to the August recess and the breakthrough negotiations occurred on the final summer weekend. Some of the many experts, lobbyists and organizers who worked to refine the bill's provisions included Leah C. Stokes, Adrian Deveny, Katherine Hamilton, Ari Appel, Mike Carr, Danielle Deiseroth, Ari Mathusiak, Camila Thorndike, Jamal Raad, Topher Spiro, and Yogin Kothari; the overall approach was shaped by Manchin and Senators Ron Wyden, Mark Warner and Chris Coons, while Representative Scott Peters worked to add pro-pharmaceutical industry limits to the Medicare drug pricing provisions, Bernie Sanders contributed the basis for the Solar for All program, and Senators Elizabeth Warren and Kyrsten Sinema negotiated on shaping an alternative minimum tax for corporate book income.

On August 7, 2022, following the vote-a-rama, an unlimited marathon voting session on amendments, that lasted nearly 16 hours, the Senate passed the bill (as amended) on a 51–50 vote, with all Democrats voting in favor, all Republicans voting against, and Vice President Kamala Harris breaking the tie. On August 12, 2022, the bill was passed by the House on a 220–207 vote, with all Democrats voting in favor and all Republicans voting against it. On August 16, 2022, the bill was signed into law by President Joe Biden.

== Provisions ==
Over a period of 10 years, the law was estimated to raise revenue from:

- Prescription drug price reform to lower prices, including Medicare negotiation of drug prices for certain drugs (starting at 10 new ones per year by 2026, increasing to more than 20 additional ones per year by 2029) and rebates from drug makers who price gouge – $281 billion
- Imposing a selective 15% corporate minimum tax rate for companies with higher than $1 billion of annual financial statement income – $222 billion
- Increased tax enforcement – $181 billion
- Imposing a 1% excise tax on stock buybacks – $74 billion
- 2-year extension of the limitation on excess business losses – $53 billion

In the same time period, it would spend this revenue on:

- Addressing domestic energy security and climate change, including funding for drought resiliency in western states – $391 billion
- Continuing for three more years the expansion of Affordable Care Act subsidies originally expanded under the American Rescue Plan Act of 2021 – $64 billion
- Changes to Medicare Part D, low-income subsidies, vaccine coverage, and insulin – $44 billion
- Increased funding for the IRS for modernization and increased tax enforcement, including the hiring of up to 87,000 new IRS employees – $80 billion

$663 billion of the law's climate action investments are embedded in the federal tax code. Of these, McKinsey & Company estimates that roughly half the tax savings will go to corporations. As part of the overall investment into clean energy, the law created a green bank, extended the solar investment tax credit for 10 years and invested $30 billion in nuclear power (including $700 million for high-assay low enrichment uranium (HALEU) fuel source research and development and $150 million for new Office of Nuclear Energy research) and $760 million in facilitating electric power transmission siting reform. It also invests $12 billion in electric vehicle incentives, $14 billion in home energy efficiency upgrades, $22 billion in home energy supply improvements, and $37 billion in advanced manufacturing. (The latter amount includes $5.46 billion for a DOE program for zero-emissions industrial tech demonstrations, $10 billion for the renewed 48C tax credit, and more than $5 billion to the USDOT and GSA to lower embedded emissions in procurement.) $19.5 billion goes to investments in climate-smart agriculture, more than $5 billion goes to revising remediation programs for those affected by discriminatory USDA lending practices, $5 billion goes to forest protection and urban heat island reductions, and nearly $3 billion goes to coastal habitat protection. Lastly, the act gives $1.005 billion to various agencies to increase staffing levels and kickstart permitting reform, particularly of environmental reviews.

Alternatively, the act's climate investments can be summarized as follows: $196–372 billion in energy, $67–183 billion in manufacturing, $28–48 billion in building retrofits and energy efficiency, $23–436 billion in transportation, $22–26 billion in environmental justice, land use, air pollution reduction and/or resilience, and $3–21 billion in agriculture.

However, the law also requires that for federal lands, oil and gas auctions take place before wind and solar leasing, even as it provides for the Interior Department to raise royalty rates on oil and gas projects from 12.5% to 16.7%.

The law contained provisions that cap insulin costs at $35/month and will cap out-of-pocket drug costs at $2,000 for people on Medicare, among other provisions. The law also extended Affordable Care Act health insurance exchange subsidies, preventing people making above four times the poverty line from ineligibility for the exchanges.

Several provisions in the initial deal between Schumer and Manchin were changed after negotiations with Senator Sinema: a provision narrowing the carried interest loophole was dropped, a 1% excise tax on stock buybacks was added, manufacturing exceptions were added to the corporate minimum tax (itself having been crafted by Elizabeth Warren and refined by Lawrence Summers and Natasha Sarin), and funding for drought relief for western states was added.

== Projected impacts ==
=== Economic ===
==== Short-term inflation ====
The Congressional Budget Office and others estimated that the act would have no statistically significant effect on inflation in 2022 and 2023.

==== Medium-term inflation ====
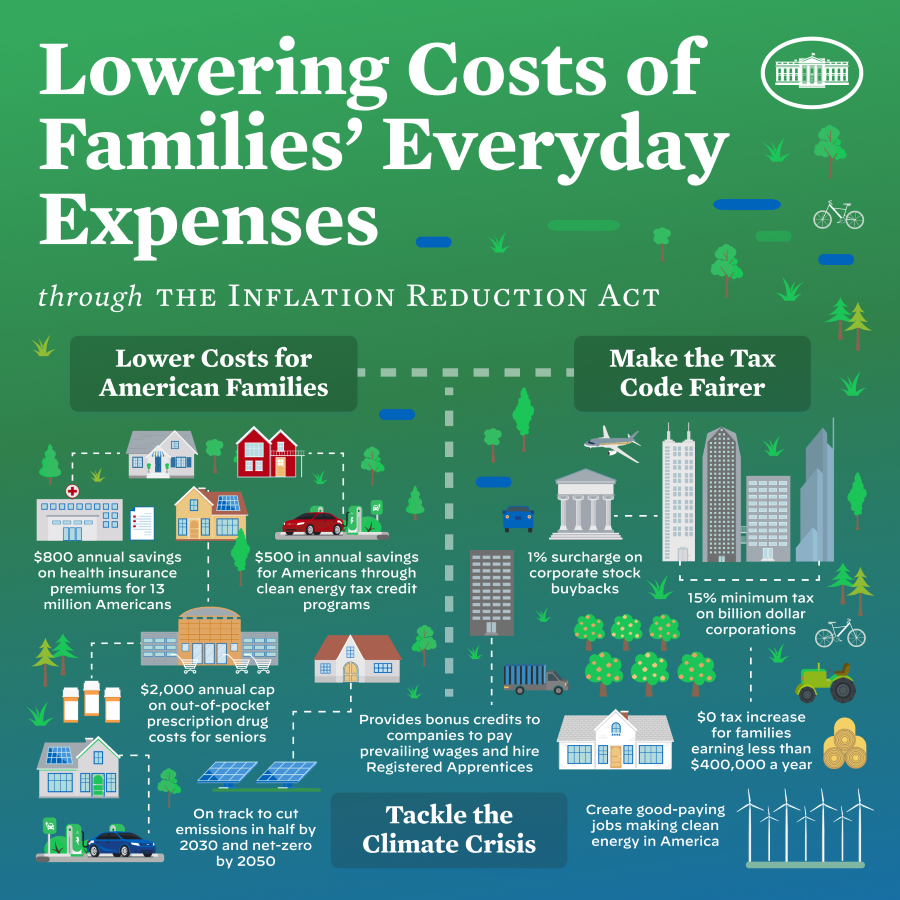
Inflation Reduction Act summary graphic from the White House

The nonpartisan Committee for a Responsible Federal Budget, alongside the Swiss business lobbying group World Economic Forum analyzed the act and concluded that the "deficit reduction, along with other elements of the bill, is likely to reduce inflationary pressures and thus reduce the risk of a possible recession." It further estimates that the act would reduce the federal deficit by $1.9 trillion over a 20-year period.

Writing in Vox, Rebecca Leber cites economists who predict that the act will make the US less exposed to fossilflation, which is inflation caused by reliance on volatile commodity markets like the ones for fossil fuels.

Gernot Wagner argues that the benefits of the act will likely not be felt before the 2024 election, but that the act is a great long-term strategy to decouple from volatile energy markets that drive inflation and that the act will reduce inflation over the medium to long-term.

==== Deficit reduction estimates ====
The World Economic Forum estimates that the act would prevent the federal debt from growing by $1.9 trillion over a 20-year period.

Former Biden administration staffers Natasha Sarin and Mark Mazur found that the act's investment in IRS tax collection would have increased revenues by $560 billion over 10 years before the Fiscal Responsibility Act's changes, and would increase revenues by $280 billion after them instead, though both findings were still much more than the CBO's projections.

==== Jobs estimates ====
A University of Massachusetts study projects that the law will generate 912,000 jobs per year.

Modeling by the group Energy Innovation, a nonpartisan energy and climate think tank, estimated that the law would lead to the creation of 1.4 million to 1.5 million additional jobs and increase the GDP 0.84–0.88% by 2030.

The climate think tank Rocky Mountain Institute estimated that if businesses and consumers take sufficient advantage of the act's provisions to meet national climate goals, Texas would see investments of $131 billion creating 116,000 jobs, California would see $117 billion creating 140,000 jobs, Florida $62 billion creating 85,000 jobs and Illinois $38 billion creating 42,000 jobs. The same analysis notes that the states seeing the four largest per capita investments from the act, ranging between roughly $7,000 and $12,000, would be Wyoming, North Dakota, West Virginia, and Louisiana, all Republican states.

E2 projects 74,181 jobs and an estimated $86,320,800,000 in investments. That will entail 210 projects in 38 states.

=== Energy and climate change ===
==== Climate action's fiscal impact ====
The Inflation Reduction Act is the largest piece of federal legislation ever to address climate change. According to the CBO and JCT, it will invest $783 billion in provisions relating to energy security and climate change. This includes $663 billion in tax incentives, and $27 billion for a green bank created by amending the Clean Air Act. However, other forecasts differ from the CBO's and JCT's reports. A report by Credit Suisse projects that the total climate spending in the act would be $800 billion, Goldman Sachs predicts a total of $1.2 trillion, the Penn Wharton Budget Model predicts $1.045 trillion, and an analysis by the Brookings Institution finds a central case of $902 billion.

==== Assessments of spending by area ====
The summary provided by Senate Democrats identifies primary goals as driving down consumer energy costs, increasing energy security, and reducing greenhouse gas emissions, with an emphasis on neutral treatment of technology choice for the energy tax credits, as described by Senator Ron Wyden. According to science communicator Hank Green, the largest allocation areas are: $128 billion for renewable energy and grid energy storage, $30 billion for nuclear power, $12 billion for electric vehicle incentives, $14 billion for home energy efficiency upgrades, $22 billion for home energy supply improvements, and $37 billion for advanced manufacturing. (The latter amount includes $5.46 billion for a DOE program for zero-emissions industrial tech demonstrations, $10 billion for the renewed 48C tax credit, and more than $5 billion to the USDOT and GSA to lower embedded emissions in procurement.) An assortment of additional measures includes $32 billion for investments in rural economies, racial justice in farming, forestlands and coastal habitats, $3 billion in tax incentives for installing carbon capture and storage at existing power plants, $3 billion to electrify the USPS fleet, $3 billion to reconnect neighborhoods harmed by infrastructure potentially via freeway removal, investments in direct air capture, sustainable aviation fuel, grants for high voltage electric power transmission and decarbonization of port equipment, garbage trucks, school buses and local government fleets, and purchases of rural electric cooperative debt alongside other assistance to cooperatives. Finally, over $1 billion is allotted to internal reform of agencies, particularly the Federal Permitting Improvement Steering Council (established by the FAST Act in 2015) and Council on Environmental Quality (established by the National Environmental Policy Act in 1969), to speed up environmental reviews for select climate-friendly projects.

Climate scientist Miriam Nielsen's alternative summary of the act's climate provisions, using much broader categories and rough estimates from Ben Beachy of the BlueGreen Alliance, is as follows: $220 billion in energy, $67 billion in manufacturing, $48 billion in building retrofits and energy efficiency, $33 billion in transportation, $26 billion in environmental justice, land use and resilience, and $21 billion in agriculture. Wharton's estimates, however, yield $372 billion in energy, $183 billion in manufacturing, $28 billion in building retrofits and energy efficiency, $436 billion in transportation, $22 billion in air pollution reduction, and $3 billion in agriculture. Boston Consulting Group's executives project $196 billion from the act will be used for clean energy, $23 billion will be used for transportation, $17 billion for "clean technology" aimed at hard-to-abate emissions, and $71 billion for clean manufacturing, as well as $61 billion for other purposes. Credit Suisse projects at least $250 billion in advanced manufacturing tax credits and $326 billion in energy tax credits will be used.

In the specific area of direct cash payments from 2022 to 2031, the Joint Committee on Taxation forecast that of the Section 45X advanced manufacturing credit's total cost of $30.6 billion, direct cash payments would make up $14.7 billion. Of the $30 billion Section 45U nuclear power credit, direct pay would make up $14.4 billion. Of the $13.2 Section 45V hydrogen credit, direct pay would make up $5.3 billion, of the $3.2 billion Section 45Q carbon sequestration credit, $1.6 billion, and of the $11.2 billion Section 45Y clean electricity production credit, $30 million.

In April 2024, investment bank Evercore projected that over the next decade from that year, the share of production to investment tax credits would be 80%–20%, that credit market sizes for clean energy and for manufacturing would reach rough parity in 2028 before the former would outgrow the latter, and that the overall transferable tax credit market would jump from $47 billion a year in 2024 to over $100 billion a year in the 2030-2033 period, for a cumulative total of around $810 billion by 2033.

==== Home energy assistance ====
The act aims to decrease residential energy costs by focusing on improvements to home energy efficiency. Measures include $9 billion in home energy rebate programs that focus on improving access to energy efficient technologies, and 10 years of consumer tax credits for the use of heat pumps, rooftop solar, and high-efficiency electric heating, ventilation, air conditioning and water heating.

The act includes a 30% tax credit ($1,200 to $2,000 per year) and different types of rebates (reaching $14,000) for homeowners who will increase the energy efficiency of their homes. In some cases, all upgrade expenses will be returned.

The act expands select current incentives in a tier-based system, beginning in 2023. The act specifies that commercial buildings must update efficiency by 25%, compared to a reference building, to qualify for $0.50 per square foot of tax credit for the first tier, increasing to a maximum of $5.00 per square foot for the final tier. The tax credits also extend to single and multi-family housing, requiring 50% less annual energy consumption compared to similar units. Vincent Barnes, a senior vice president from Alliance to Save Energy in Washington, D.C, stated that these policies were meant to reduce energy costs and demand on the power grid.

==== Energy production ====
There are also funds allocated to national clean energy production. This includes the continuation of the production tax credits (at least $30 billion) and investment tax credit ($10 billion) toward clean energy manufacturing, including solar power, wind power, and grid energy storage. Modifications to these credits effectively allow the federal government to predictably and directly pay utility cooperatives, state and local governments, nonprofits and publicly-owned utilities without them needing to attract investment firms, in a manner similar to the Earned Income Tax Credit.

==== Hydrogen ====
The act changes the Section 45V tax credit to offer increased percentages to green hydrogen and pink hydrogen producers for each kilogram produced via electrolysis of water, allowing 100 percent coverage for very low-carbon methods, thus potentially enabling more than $100 billion in forgone revenue to go toward building the hydrogen economy. On December 22, 2023, the Treasury Department released its proposed guidance on eligibility. It mandates that most of these electrolyzers must be placed near new clean energy production sites (the principles of "geographic correlation"/"deliverability" and "additionality"/"new supply"), and run at the same time as peak supply periods (the principle of "hourly matching").

==== Transportation ====
The act amended the $7,500 Section 30D tax credit for the purchase of new electric vehicles to two $3,750 credits based on whether or not the vehicle's critical mineral and battery component supply chains are located in countries with a free trade agreement with the United States and North America, respectively. These were designed to simultaneously continue to incentivize electric vehicle adoption while also encouraging manufacturers to use and shift their supply chains to 'friendly' nations. Additionally, a new $4,000 Section 25E tax credit was allocated toward the purchase of used electric vehicles, in an effort to increase low- and middle-income access to this technology. A further, new Section 45W credit offered $7,500 for commercial vehicles weighing under 14,000 pounds and $40,000 weighing over, which was interpreted to also include electric vehicle sold under lease. These credits were projected to lead to an average of $500 in savings on energy spending for every family that receives the maximal benefit of these incentives. Many of these incentives have since been cancelled due to the passage of the One Big Beautiful Bill Act.

The act allocates $3 billion for helping disadvantaged communities with sustainable transportation matters, including reconnecting communities separated by transport infrastructure, assuring safe and affordable transportation "and community engagement activities". This should improve transit-oriented development. Projects improving connectivity and walkability in these neighborhoods can get grants reaching 80–100% of the overall cost. The act also supports biking.

The act encourages sustainable aviation fuel producers to make more, through the Section 40B and 6426 tax credits that give them $1.25 to $1.75 per gallon of fuel produced through December 2024. The act also includes a replacement credit called Section 45Z, to run from January 2025 through December 2028.

==== Agriculture, forests, marine and rural development ====
Some $14 billion of the clean energy package will go to rural areas, and include building biofuel infrastructure. This includes $9.5 billion for a new grant program called Empowering Rural America, with cooperatives encouraged to apply during a window from July 31 to September 15, 2023.

The act also allocates funds for rural communities, racial and economic justice in farming, marine ecosystems and forestland, including $19.5 billion to invest in climate-smart agriculture (split into $8.45 billion for the Environmental Quality Incentives Program, $4.95 billion for the Regional Conservation Partnership Program, $3.25 billion for the Conservation Stewardship Program, and $1.40 billion for the Agricultural Conservation Easement Program, $1 billion for conservation technical assistance, $300 million for a carbon sequestration and emission inventory program, and $100 million in administrative expenses), $5 billion to invest in forest conservation and urban tree planting (split into $2.15 billion for the National Forest System and $2.75 billion for other forests including in urban areas), $3.1 billion to help farmers with high-risk operations caused by USDA-backed loans, $2.6 billion to protect and restore coastal habitats, and $2.2 billion to redress proven claims from socially disadvantaged farmers and ranchers of discrimination by the USDA's lending programs, as well as "$125 million for technical assistance, outreach, and mediation; $250 million for land loss assistance, such as heirs' property and fractionated land; $250 million for agricultural education emphasizing scholarships and career development at historically Black, tribal, and Hispanic colleges; and $10 million for equity commissions at USDA".

==== Novel financing methods ====
One $27 billion competitive grant program is a green bank called the Greenhouse Gas Reduction Fund, intended to capitalize smaller regional green banks. The act established it by amending the Clean Air Act. The Fund has awarded $14 billion to a select few green banks nationwide for a broad variety of decarbonization investments, $6 billion to green banks in low-income and historically disadvantaged communities for similar investments, and $7 billion to state and local energy funds for decentralized solar power in communities with no financing alternatives. The EPA set the deadline to apply for the first two award initiatives for October 12, 2023 and the Solar for All initiative for September 26, 2023.

McKinsey & Company estimated in April 2023 that the GGRF would leverage about $250 billion in private investments with its first $20 billion. They also made five recommendations on project governance and impact tracking to ensure the Fund's success.

The nonprofit group Clean Energy States Alliance, which serves as a knowledge clearinghouse for state energy programs, extrapolated from funding applications for Solar for All in 35 states, DC and Puerto Rico, and projected the projects could add 2.9 gigawatts in power and deliver $2 billion in savings to 711,068 low-income households; 37 percent of the $7 billion would likely go to community solar projects, 32 percent to single-family housing, and 26 percent to multi-family housing. The CESA also noted that many states had planned wide variations in their implementation of Solar for All.

==== Pollution and emissions ====
Global carbon dioxide emissions by country in 2023:
1. China (31.8%)
2. United States (14.4%)
3. European Union (4.90%)
4. India (9.50%)
5. Russia (5.80%)
6. Japan (3.50%)
7. Other (30.1%)

The act provided funds toward the decarbonization of the U.S. economy, providing various tax credits, grants and loans toward decarbonizing the industrial sector. Among these is a program to reduce methane emissions from production and transportation of natural gas. The act also provides for a focus on communities and environmental justice by providing several grants targeting historically marginalized and disadvantaged communities that have been disproportionally impacted by environmental pollution and climate change.

Although its potential efficacy has been contested, the act was intended to cut global greenhouse gas emissions by a level similar to "eliminating the annual planet-warming pollution of France and Germany combined" and to contribute to limiting the warming of the planet to 1.5 degrees Celsius – the target of the Paris Agreement. With the act and additional federal and state measures, the USA can fulfill its pledge in the Paris Agreement: 50% greenhouse gas emissions reductions by the year 2030.

An assessment by the Rhodium Group, an independent research firm, estimated it would reduce national greenhouse gas emissions 32–42% below 2005 levels by 2030, compared to 24–35% under current policy while reducing household energy costs and improving energy security. Furthermore, Rhodium Group projects that the nuclear provisions in the act are likely to "keep much, if not all" of the nation's nuclear reactors that are at risk of retiring, estimated to be 22–38% of the fleet, online through the 2030s.

A preliminary analysis by the REPEAT Project of Princeton University estimated that the investments made by the law would reduce net emissions 42% below 2005 levels, compared to 27% under current policies (including the Infrastructure Investment and Jobs Act).

The Energy Innovation group estimated the reduction of greenhouse gas emissions at 37–41% below 2005 levels in 2030, compared to 24% without the act. This estimate of the greenhouse gas emission reduction lines up with the figure provided by the act's authors which is a 40% reduction in carbon emissions relative to 2005 levels.

Modeling from the nonpartisan research institution Resources for the Future indicates the act would decrease retail power costs by 5.2–6.7% over a ten-year period, resulting in savings of $170–220 per year for the average U.S. household. The modeling also predicts that the act would tend to stabilize electricity prices. The act would help foster a tripling in the size of the American solar power industry and provide unprecedented investment security, according to a September 2022 report by the trade group Solar Energy Industries Association.

In reaction to the Supreme Court case West Virginia v. EPA, which limited the EPA's authority to institute a program such as the Obama-era Clean Power Plan, Title VI of the IRA amended the Clean Air Act to explicitly designate carbon dioxide, hydrofluorocarbons, methane, nitrous oxide, perfluorocarbons, and sulfur hexafluoride as air pollutants to unambiguously provide the EPA congressional authorization to regulate carbon dioxide and other greenhouse gases, as well as to promote renewable energy.

=== Drug prices ===
One of the most consequential aspects of this act is the increased negotiating power granted to Medicare. Before the enactment of the Inflation Reduction Act, Medicare was notably restricted in its ability to negotiate drug prices directly with pharmaceutical companies. This limitation often resulted in higher costs for both the program and its beneficiaries. With the new rule, Medicare now engages directly with drug manufacturers, aiming to secure more favorable pricing agreements. This development has the potential to significantly alter the landscape of drug pricing, especially for high-cost medications under Medicare Part D. The Congressional Budget Office projects the Medicare drug price negotiations will save the government $98.5 billion over the next decade. The savings will be used to increase Medicare Part D benefits. Together, these drugs amounted to more than $45 billion in Medicare Part D spending from June 2022 to May 2023.

==== First selected drugs ====
In September 2023, Medicare announced the first 10 drugs selected for negotiations under the agency's drug price negotiation program. This list includes treatments for:

- Diabetes: Farxiga, Fiasp/NovoLog, Januvia, Jardiance
- Blood diseases: Eliquis, Xarelto, Imbruvica
- Heart failure: Entresto, Farxiga
- Psoriasis: Stelara, Enbrel
- Rheumatoid arthritis: Enbrel
- Crohn's disease: Stelara

=== Taxes and distributional impact ===
U.S. Treasury Department estimates of unpaid taxes indicate that over half of all unpaid taxes are attributable to the top 5% of earners.

Excerpts from the nonpartisan JCT indicated that the legislation might lead to increased payments on personal taxes for Americans of all incomes (an increase in $16.7 billion for taxpayers earning less than $200,000 a year, $14.1 billion for taxpayers earning between $200,000 and $500,000, and $23.5 billion for taxpayers earning over $500,000). This calculation was based on the assumption that companies would indirectly pass on parts of the minimum corporate tax to employees, an assumption that was criticized by Steven M. Rosenthal, a senior fellow at the nonpartisan Tax Policy Center (TPC). Economist William G. Gale, who is also co-director of the TPC, comments that it is important to consider that the calculations by the JCT did not take into account the provisions in the act that would extend premium tax credits for health plans for low- and middle-income taxpayers, provide households with tax credits for making their property more energy-efficient, and lower the price of prescription drugs.

The Tax Policy Center estimated that the bottom 80% tax filers by income would receive a net benefit, if ACA premium tax credits (subsidies) are included. The 80th-99th percentile would incur a small cost (0-0.1% increase in average federal tax rate) while the top 1% would incur a 0.2% increase. The costs mainly are imposed indirectly as corporations facing higher taxes may reduce the wage increases or levels for workers; individual tax rates were not changed.

== Implementation and results ==
The Biden administration's main overseer of the act's implementation were veteran Democratic political advisor John Podesta, and climate policy leader Kristina Costa. From 2022 to 2024, Podesta and Costa headed the White House Office on Clean Energy Innovation and Implementation, established by Executive Order 14082 to implement the act.

=== Economy ===
Research from climate policy analyst Jack Conness has revealed that $116 billion worth of 181 climate-friendly tech manufacturing investments within the United States, have been announced by companies since the passage of the Inflation Reduction Act, creating 99,500 projected jobs as of November 14, 2024; when considered together with CHIPS Act investments, the total comes out to 218 projects worth $388 billion creating 135,800 jobs. Conness found that due to the act's incentives, North Carolina would receive the individual project with the most money ($12.6 billion from Toyota in battery plants), while Georgia would host the most projects (25), the most new jobs overall (14,343), and the largest dollar amount in overall investments ($16 billion, followed by North Carolina's $15.6 billion), and South Carolina would receive the individual project with the most jobs created (4,000 from Scout Motors). More of the act's dollars went to congressional districts with Republican winners in 2024 ($96 billion) than those with Democratic winners ($17 billion). 68 percent of the act's investments were in batteries, while electric vehicle investments made up 14 percent and solar investments made up 13 percent. Conness found that of the top 20 job-creating IRA-linked projects, only five had faced delays, and a majority would begin production by summer 2025.

In a November 2023 report the interest group Environmental Entrepreneurs and the research firm BW found 210 announced projects directly linked to the Inflation Reduction Act, in the first year since its signing. They stated that the projects would create nearly 403,000 jobs, more than 100,000 of which would be permanent. According to editor in chief Jeff St. John of Canary Media, "During the projects' construction phases, assumed to last five years from project announcement to completion, the report estimates the creation of 142,300 direct jobs, 55,900 indirect jobs, and 105,300 jobs induced by the direct and indirect workers spending their wages." More than 185,000 of these jobs would be in electric vehicles, 48,795 would be in battery storage, 42,100 would be in solar and wind power, 21,322 would be in clean fuels, and nearly 5,600 would be in electric power transmission and distribution. The authors project that the act would bring about "$156 billion added to U.S. GDP, $111 billion in new wages for workers, and more than $32 billion generated in tax revenue for federal, state, and local governments." Environmental Entrepreneurs later found in August 2024 that $125.9 billion had been invested due to the act, and 334 new projects and 109,278 jobs had been created. 62,875 jobs had been created in electric vehicles, 24,835 in batteries and storage, 29,242 in solar and wind, 3,568 in clean fuels, and 2,348 in transmission and distribution.

In a video dated December 6, 2023, the Financial Times found the IRA and CaSA together catalyzed over $224 billion in investments and over 100,000 new jobs by the preceding July.

The next day, the Rhodium Group–Massachusetts Institute of Technology partnership Clean Investment Monitor put the July 2022–September 2023 investment total at $225 billion, most of it in electric vehicle supply, though it did not explicitly mention the act. Clean investment grew by 42 percent across that period. As a share of nationwide private investment, it grew from 3.4 percent to 4.9. The states that benefited the most were Nevada, South Carolina, Arizona, Tennessee, and Montana. Its second-anniversary report found the total from July 2022 to June 2024 was $493 billion, with EV supply taking a large share but solar and storage catching up, and much of it due to the act. Clean investment grew by 72 percent during that period. As a share of nationwide investment, it grew from 3.4 percent to 5.5. The states that benefited the most were Nevada, Wyoming, Arizona, Tennessee, and Montana; the reporters found clean investment made up above 1 percent of Tennessee and Kentucky's respective GDPs. In March of that year, Treasury Department researchers used the Monitor's data to confirm that the act had spurred a monthly average of $4.5 billion in investments in 'energy communities' formerly dependent on fossil fuel extraction, $1 billion more than the average in the rest of the nation, and that 75 percent of the act's investments went to communities under the national median income.

In May 2025, journalist Michael Thomas found that due to the act "78% of new solar, wind, and battery projects have been built in Republican districts. 77.7 GW of clean energy capacity has been built in these districts since August 2022, bringing in roughly $100 billion in private investment." Of the top 30 House districts benefited by new clean energy gigawatts, 25 were Republican-held.

Wellesley College professor of environmental studies Jay Turner said that as of July 21, 2024 the act fostered $94.2 billion in 121 new investments in the electric vehicle supply chain, creating a projected 60,597 new jobs across the United States, Canada and Mexico. The number of new mines the act incentivized in 2023 was 101, the amount of battery manufacturing capacity brought up to 348 GWh, and EV manufacturing capacity brought up to 2,913,900 vehicles.

The research firm Climate Power estimated that the act spurred $89.5 billion of investments in over 90 new projects creating 101,036 predicted clean energy-related jobs in 31 states, between August 16, 2022 and January 31, 2023, and that while Georgia, Michigan, and Texas saw eight new IRA-linked projects each, the most of any states, Georgia, Idaho and Tennessee would see the largest overall investments by dollar amount (ranging from $10.4 billion to $15.3 billion), and Kansas, Georgia and Tennessee would see the most jobs created. In its August 9, 2024 update, Climate Power had found at least 334,565 new clean energy jobs were created to date, across 646 projects and $372 billion in investments across 47 states and Puerto Rico. Georgia, Michigan and Texas saw the most projects and money, while the former two and New York State saw the most jobs at 32-24,000. The firm's January 14, 2025 update found the numbers increased to at least 406,007 new jobs across 751 projects and $422 billion in investments across 48 states and Puerto Rico. Georgia, New York, and Texas saw the most jobs at 43-26,000; Michigan saw the most projects at 74, and New York saw the most money at $115.46 billion.

In August 2023, the Solar Energy Industries Association reported that the act had created more than 20,000 jobs and incentivized $20 billion in new solar power tech manufacturing and 155 gigawatts of generating capacity in the law's first year, and projected it would incentivize $144 billion more in such investments by 2033 than under a no-Act scenario. In September 2024, the SEIA reported that the act had helped quadruple solar manufacturing capacity in the U.S. to 31 gigawatts since its passage. It also reported that in the first half of 2024 solar installations represented 67 percent of all new energy capacity in the U.S., and forecasted a 4 percent annual solar market growth rate through 2029, buoyed by the act's Solar for All initiative.

The trade group American Clean Power's January 2023 assessment of business announcements of IRA-linked investments in renewables and battery plants, during the period between the act's signing and November 30, 2022, yielded a figure of over $40 billion creating 6,850 jobs. 80 percent of these investments are in Republican-held districts, mostly in the Great Plains or South. Its August 2023 update recorded a total of 97 manufacturing investments worth $270 billion spurred by the act between the August 16 enactment date and July 31, 2023, 83 with defined locations, with the majority of these being solar power tech plants. American Clean Power estimates these investments are worth more than all those made in the previous eight years combined, and will create 29,780 new jobs and $4.5 billion in customer savings.

In June 2024, CNN found nearly 80 percent of the act's new jobs were created in Republican-held House districts, consistent with earlier projections, as well as a later Bloomberg Opinion article that found $161 billion of clean investments had gone to those districts and $42 billion to Democratic-held districts since Biden took office in January 2021.

According to the New Democrat–linked think tank Center for American Progress, the act, the CHIPS and Science Act, and the Infrastructure Investment and Jobs Act have together catalyzed over 35,000 public and private investments. Economists Noah Smith and Joseph Politano credited the three acts together for spurring booms in factory construction and utility jobs, as well as limiting geographic concentrations of key industries to ensure more dispersed job creation nationwide, though they raised issues of whether the three would serve to limit project delays and significantly increase labor productivity in the long term. The Biden administration itself claimed that as of January 10, 2025, the IIJA, CaSA, and IRA together catalyzed $1 trillion in private investment (including $449 billion in electronics and semiconductors, $184 billion in electric vehicles and batteries, $215 billion in clean power, $93 billion in clean energy tech manufacturing and infrastructure, and $51 billion in heavy industry) and over $756.2 billion in public infrastructure spending (including $99 billion in energy aside from tax credits in the IRA).

In a 2026 working paper, Leah C. Stokes and Denis Lomov of the UCSB, using data from the Clean Economy Tracker, found that the IRA spurred $121 billion in investments (from 2022 to 2024) and created 133,100 jobs across 506 energy tech factories, in addition to helping boost 2024 Democratic Party vote share by 1.5 percentage points in the 234 congressional districts housing the factories.

==== Labor impact ====
In October 2023, Lee Harris of The American Prospect covered one example of synergies between the act and the growth of an organizing model known as sectoral bargaining: three unions in solar power construction agreed to a nationwide deal to divide work on future projects (California being exempt because of a similar five-union agreement). On August 16, 2024, the United Steelworkers announced it had successfully reached an electoral neutrality agreement with solar panel manufacturer Convalt, making it easier to form a union at IRA-linked project sites in Pennsylvania and New York.

On June 25, 2024, the IRS finalized the guidance on prevailing wage and apprenticeship bonuses for the most important of the act's tax credits.

In an article marking the law's second anniversary, reporter Emily Pontecorvo of Heatmap News found that the law increased construction union membership in areas with mostly non-union labor markets, especially in solar power. Due to the investment tax credits' rules on Project Labor Agreements, prevailing wages and apprenticeships, the law also set up a new dynamic where energy developers have started to negotiate with unions early in their project planning, and fostered the growth of a new tax credit compliance industry. Pontecorvo also found, however, that wide disparities remained between union and non-union apprenticeships and wages, and that non-union apprenticeships were still poorly regulated. She later analyzed an August 29 Energy Department report that found that even with growth in the fossil fuel workforce, unionization in clean energy grew faster than in the overall energy sector, and that unionized firms had an easier time hiring job applicants than non-unionized firms, for which she credited the act; the DOE found that clean energy job numbers grew 4.2 percent in 2023, twice the national rate for all employers, and up 3.9 percent from the previous year. Pontecorvo also reported that the energy workforce continued to suffer from a lack of diversity, particularly of gender.

==== Fiscal impact ====
The law significantly enlarged the tax credit market. It includes significant tax credits for companies making products considered environmentally-friendly, but small companies tend not to pay enough taxes, so the law does not help them. The law allows such companies to sell their tax credits to larger companies. The market is expected to reach $80 billion per year and help those large companies.

In February 2024, The New York Times and Energy Storage News reported that it was clear that companies were using the credits accorded by the law far more than was predicted. According to government officials they interviewed, the increase of revenue from improved Internal Revenue Service tax enforcement will be more than enough to cover the losses, so the deficit will still be reduced. The tax credits with the highest market value are for grid energy storage. The next month, the Times reported that the IRS had received from about 500 companies registrations of more than 45,500 projects attached to direct pay or possible small business sales of the IRA's energy tax credits, up from only about 1,000 in January.

=== Environment ===
According to Rhodium Group and the World Economic Forum, in the first year of implementation, the act had a significant impact on the environment. The Rhodium Group's expectations for GHG emissions reductions by the year 2030, relative to the level of 2005, moved from 17–30% to 29–42%, and to a 32–51% decline by the year 2035. More than 170,000 green jobs were created.

The sales of heat pumps exceeded the sales of gas boilers for the first time in history. 15% of households now use a heat pump as a primary source of heating. The United States Environmental Protection Agency used dozens of millions of dollars to improve air quality and hundreds of millions for environmental justice and local climate plans. The National Oceanic and Atmospheric Administration spent hundreds of millions for protecting coastal communities and ecosystems from the impact of climate change. More than $1 billion is allocated to equitable access to urban trees.

The governors of four states, Florida, South Dakota, Iowa, and Kentucky, refused to accept decarbonization money from the act's Climate Pollution Reduction Grants program. The act allows the forfeited money, $3 million per state, to go to the three largest metropolitan areas in each state instead, though cities such as Davenport, Iowa, and Sioux Falls, South Dakota, have still refused the money.

From June 2023 to February 2024, the EPA awarded $250 million from the CPRG (Climate Pollution Reduction Grants) program to 82 cities and 45 states to update their climate action plans. On July 22, 2024, the EPA awarded from the same program $4.3 billion to 25 cities, states, tribal governments, and coalitions of the three for implementing community driven solutions to reduce greenhouse gas emissions by 148 million metric tons by 2030 and by 971 million tons by 2050. The solutions mainly belong to the domains of energy, buildings, agriculture, industry, waste, and ecosystems. The largest recipient, at $499,997,415 for vehicle decarbonization, is the South Coast Air Quality Management District in California.

==== Energy and industry ====
The act deals extensively with trade flows of clean energy and their effects on domestic manufacturing. As an example, the Treasury Department clarified on May 12, 2023, that in order to be eligible for the Sections 45, 45Y, 48 and 48E tax credits, solar panel manufacturers and installers need to source at least 40 percent of their components in total from within the U.S., regardless of solar cell origin, thereby creating a compromise between solar panel installers who favored keeping Chinese imports cheap and domestic solar cell manufacturers who want to build more factories in America.

Significant improvements were achieved in the domain of green building through the installation of efficient heating, ventilation, and air conditioning systems, and more.

For the first $8.5 billion in home rebate programs, the Department of Energy released its first draft guidance for states on July 27, 2023. The guidance entails the DOE distributing $4.3 billion to states to work with the DOE to create rebate programs for whole-home upgrades and $4.28 billion to states for appliance replacement rebates, with the suggestion that half the money go to households below 80 percent of area median income.

On November 17, 2023, the DOE announced $169 million funded by the act for nine projects at 15 sites to accelerate US-made heat pump manufacturing. On February 14, 2024, the DOE announced a further $63 million funded by the act to accelerate the growth of domestic manufacturing of residential heat pumps, heat pump water heaters, and other heat pump systems and components.

On December 4, 2023, the DOE and IRS announced they had received over 46,000 applications for new energy project financing under the Section 48E bonus investment tax credit since October 29. The first-year selectees, the Treasury Department projected, would add 1.8 gigawatts of capacity to the nationwide grid.

On March 6, 2024, the Department of Agriculture announced it would advance requests for $139 million to be approved, to five solar and battery storage projects in Arizona, Colorado, Hawaii and Nebraska, under the Powering Affordable Clean Energy (PACE) program that the act created. On the 11th, the IRS finalized the rules of its direct pay program allowing tax-exempt nonprofits, the TVA, state and local governments and electric cooperatives to access the act's panoply of tax credits. On the 13th, the DOE announced the first conditional commitment of a $72.8 million loan guarantee to a Tribal energy project under the act, the Viejas Microgrid benefiting Kumeyaay residents near Alpine, California.

On March 25, 2024, the Biden administration announced the first 33 grant recipients of the Department of Energy's $6 billion Industrial Demonstrations Program to reduce embedded emissions in factories and materials processing, of which the Inflation Reduction Act funds $5.46 billion. Cement and concrete industry projects received $1.5 billion in total, steelmaking projects received $1.5 billion, and chemical engineering and refinery projects $1.2 billion. The Biden administration expected these projects to drive 1.4 million tons in carbon emissions cuts, though it had not finalized most of the grants even by November 11, putting them at the risk of being rescinded by the succeeding Trump administration. On the 27th, the DOE announced it had reached a conditional agreement for a $1.52 billion loan to Holtec International to reopen the Palisades Nuclear Generating Station, the first such agreement under the act's Title 17 Clean Energy Financing Section 1706 program. On the 28th, the Agriculture Department revealed the 541 recipients across 44 states of $124 million from the Rural Energy for America Program, which the act greatly augmented. On March 29, the DOE announced over 100 recipients of the first $4 billion from the act's renewal of the Section 48C tax credit, opening the remaining $6 billion to applications on May 22.

On April 4, 2024, the Biden administration announced the eight recipients of the first $20 billion of the Greenhouse Gas Reduction Fund. For the $14 billion National Clean Investment Fund, the recipients are the consumer-focused Climate United Fund ($6.97 billion to a consortium of Calvert Impact, Self-Help Ventures Fund and Community Preservation Corporation), the Coalition for Green Capital ($5 billion), and Power Forward Communities ($2 billion); collectively they have pledged 60 percent of funds would go to low-income and marginalized communities, well above the 40 percent required by Biden. For the $6 billion Clean Communities Investment Accelerator program to disburse money exclusively and deep into such communities, they are four CDFIs (Opportunity Finance Network, Inclusiv, Native CDFI Network and Appalachian Community Capital) receiving a total of roughly $5.1 billion, and a coalition of community organizations called the Justice Climate Fund receiving $940 million. The Biden administration projects that they will leverage $7 from the private sector for every dollar of public investment, and slash emissions by up to 40 million metric tons by 2032 through a very wide variety of projects.

On April 11, the Interior Department finalized a rule cutting rents on federal lands for renewable energy development by 80 percent, in part by clarifying definitions in Section 50265(b)(1) of the act. On the 12th, the Department raised rents on federal lands for oil and gas drilling by 1000 percent (the first such raise since 1960) and royalties by 4 percentage points, and directed drillers to pump away from sensitive wildlife areas, thus formalizing more parts of the act. On April 22, the Biden administration announced the 60 recipients of the $7 billion Solar for All program. The EPA forecasted the projects would serve a total of 900,000 low-income households, and generate them $350 million in annual savings and $8 billion cumulatively.

In May 2024, multiple solar companies told Bloomberg News that they had faced borderline dumping of solar panels from China, and criticized the act for not providing enough tax credits to help with manufacturing upstream, including the ingots and wafers of polycrystalline silicon needed to make the cells, as well as for unclear guidance that does not say whether domestic panel content incentives can go to them; as a result, several US solar manufacturers have slowed their timelines on plant construction and pressed the Biden administration to build up tariffs while they wait for better guidance. On May 14, the Department of Energy announced a loan guarantee of $1.66 billion under the act's expansion of the Title 17 Clean Energy Financing Program, to Plug Power to scale up clean hydrogen production in six of its facilities.

On July 24, 2024 the DOE's Grid Deployment Office announced it was awarding $371 million to 20 projects across 16 states for speeding up high-voltage transmission line approvals.

In August 2024, the Treasury Department had found that in the 2023 tax year, 3.4 million households had claimed more than $8 billion against their federal income tax for home energy improvements; about 1.2 million had claimed $6 billion in credits for home clean energy, while 2.3 million had claimed $6 billion in credits for home energy efficiency improvements. The average benefit was estimated at $880 per family.

Based on the report, E&E News and The Guardian found households with annual incomes above $100,000 claimed energy tax credits such as the home production and efficiency credits at higher rates among their cohort, about 1.6-4 percent of all such filers, compared to those earning below, at about 0.7-0.9 percent of all such filers. Wealthier families received about 66 percent of the total $5.5 billion in credits in 2023, with households earning over $200,000 claiming $2 billion. By contrast, the poorest 25 percent received only $32 million in credits. In addition, E&E News noted that many states have yet to administer rebate programs meant for low-income households, which could further address wealth imbalances.

Around that time, the Biden administration claimed successful implementation of a bonus credit for solar installer firms (not households) in low-income communities and Tribal country in its first year. According to Pontecorvo, the program steered nearly 48,000 solar projects to low-income areas and Tribal lands, with an estimated $270 million a year in energy savings, and 96 Tribal projects approved; no wind projects were supported. The law caps the amount of power the program can support per year at 1.8 gigawatts total, with certain types of recipients getting different subtotals. Pontecorvo found that while the program's data gathering process is difficult to assess, 98 percent of the money was allocated based mostly on installers' locations, without requirements to ensure that the savings reach low-income residents. The distribution of funds was uneven, with higher demand than expected from recipient subcategories like community solar projects, while other projects, like those on Tribal lands, generated lower demand; this unevenness continued to hold in 2024 even with some power caps being raised. The bonus credit is set to expire in 2031, though changes such as expansion to other clean energy technologies like small-scale hydroelectric and geothermal are set to take effect in 2025.

The IRS is set to finalize the 45Q tax credit's rules to empower carbon dioxide flooding, a method of using the captured greenhouse gas to improve oil extraction in nearly depleted fields, at a level of between $60 and $130 per metric ton of carbon dioxide sequestered. Notably, Vicki Hollub, CEO of Occidental Petroleum, praised the Inflation Reduction Act in a 2024 earnings call for enabling the company to expand its operations, while ExxonMobil and Eneos have started reviving production in certain oil fields because of the act. Critics note the IRS relies on self-reported data from companies, verified with EPA resources not intended for tax purposes. Verifying the amount of carbon dioxide stored versus what leaks out is problematic due to gaps in data and oversight. A lack of interagency coordination between the IRS and EPA complicates accurate monitoring and reporting; investigations have revealed that significant portions of tax credits awarded under 45Q did not meet EPA's reporting requirements, raising questions about the program's integrity.

On September 5, the USDA announced that $7.3 billion in funding for 16 rural electric cooperative projects curbing 43 million tons in emissions would be approved under the act's New ERA program.

In October 2024, Deputy Treasury Secretary Wally Adeyemo revealed to Pontecorvo that he and his staff were planning to finalize the tax credit rules for clean hydrogen, advanced manufacturing, and tech-neutral clean power by December, and that bioenergy remained a sticking point for the latter; the reasons behind the Treasury's slow pace, he claimed, were understaffing and the review backlog of 30,000 comments on the clean hydrogen draft rule. Jael Holzman reported that soon after, experts in energy markets pointed to a lack of coordination between the IIJA's Hydrogen Hubs program and the IRA's clean hydrogen tax credits, price increases for electrolyzers, and the historically low cost of natural gas as additional reasons for the withdrawal of investment in Hub projects.

On November 12, 2024, the Biden administration announced the parameters of its first ever methane fee for oil and gas companies, the Waste Emissions Charge, which the act mandated. The Charge was to be set at $900 per metric ton in 2024, rising to $1,500 per metric ton in 2026, and was forecasted to remove 1.2 million tons of methane (34 million tons of carbon dioxide equivalent) by 2036, with a net benefit of $2 billion. The rule was finalized early in 2025, and believed to be difficult to overturn. However, the incoming Congress overturned the regulation on March 14, 2025 via resolution, effectively abolishing the charge.

In December 2024, the clean power investment tax credit's rules were finalized, which clarify what qualifies as an energy project, what assets an offshore wind farm, geothermal heat pump or biogas plant owner can use to claim the credit, and what credit-qualifying stored hydrogen can be used for. On December 18, the DOE used the Section 1706 Program to fund Pacific Gas and Electric Company's hydropower and energy storage expansions and enable experiments in virtual power plants. On January 16, 2025, the DOE used the program to lend $22.9 billion to six utility companies, the three largest recipients being DTE Electric Company, PacifiCorp, and Consumers Energy, for similar purposes.

On January 3, 2025, the Treasury Department finalized the 45V clean hydrogen tax credit, keeping the overall approach of the "three pillars" of hourly matching, additionality/incrementality, and deliverability. Major exemptions, however, were introduced, concerning such environmentalists as Conrad Schneider of the Clean Air Task Force and Dan Esposito of the Energy Innovation think tank. These included delaying the hourly matching requirement to 2030, advantaging nuclear power plants "at the risk of retirement", and allowing hydrogen producers more leeway to claim natural gas with carbon capture counted towards the credit, though the new rules also emphasized some exemptions only apply in states with a clean energy standard and binding emissions cap. Most environmental groups praised the rules, while industry groups were more cautious in doing so. On the 10th, the USDA finalized $5.49 billion in New ERA grants and loans to 28 projects by rural electric cooperatives, and $565 million in PACE loans to 26 projects by solar nonprofits.

In total, $96.7 billion in clean energy grants under the act, or 84 percent of the energy grants, were finalized by the Biden administration by the 17th, leaving $11 billion to be handed out by the incoming president after the 20th.

==== Transportation ====
The Treasury and Internal Revenue Service published guidance on eligibility for electric vehicle owners to claim tax credits worth between $3,500 and $7,500 (the Clean Vehicle Credit, previously called the Qualified Plug-In Electric Drive Motor Vehicle Credit), aiming to not only incentivize EV adoption but also increase onshoring and friendshoring of the supply chain to 'friendly' locations. The US Treasury Department has also stated that owners who purchase eligible vehicles previous to August 16, 2022, but did not possess the vehicle until after that date, also qualify for the Clean Vehicle Credit. However, because of the requirement that qualified EVs must have half or more of its battery materials built in the US, "at least 40 percent of materials sourced from North America or a US trading partner by 2024" (with this minimum percentage meant to increase to 50 percent by 2025, 60 percent by 2026, and 70 percent by 2027) and the batteries cannot contain minerals that "were extracted, processed, or recycled by a foreign entity of concern", (Note: A foreign entity of concern is an entity that is owned by, controlled by, or subject to the jurisdiction or direction of the governments of China, Russia, North Korea, and Iran.) with a final requirement for the vehicle to undergo final assembly in North America, most currently available EVs on the market will not qualify for the tax credits. Yet, analyses show that the value of these credits are significant enough that strong incentives do exist to shift those supply chains. The Department of Energy and the Department of Transportation had published resources identifying vehicles that will likely meet all requirements for tax credits. The Department of Energy indicated that their list of eligible vehicles is not a guarantee for credit, and states that the Vehicle Identification Number (VIN) will give full manufacturing details and locations. The Treasury released its next draft guidance for EV buyers on March 31, 2023, effective immediately, with finalization expected in June, and the first update taking place in May 2024; the allowed materials source list includes the 20 United States free-trade agreements partners and Japan.

On March 13, 2024, the Neighborhood Equity and Access program, which had been combined with the IIJA's Reconnecting Communities pilot program, awarded its first $3.33 billion in grants to 132 projects for removing highways and railroads that were built through poorer neighborhoods in the mid-20th century. On April 30, 2025, the think tank Transportation for America reported that $2.46 billion in NEaA funds across 60 projects remained unobligated.

On April 30, 2024, the Treasury Department released their guidance on the Sections 40B and 6426(k) tax credits for the production of sustainable aviation fuels, specifically ethanol. "Producers of SAF are eligible for a tax credit of $1.25 to $1.75 per gallon. SAF that achieves a GHG emissions reduction of 50% is eligible for the $1.25 credit per gallon amount, and SAF that achieves a GHG emissions reduction of more than 50% is eligible for an additional $0.01 per gallon for each percentage point the reduction exceeds 50%, up to $0.50 per gallon." The IRS also released a new greenhouse gas study model for ethanol producers, and endorsed a USDA incentives program to incorporate climate-smart agriculture in corn and soybean ethanol production.

In June 2024, the Treasury Department announced that over 150,000 electric vehicles had seen more than $1 billion in savings by buyers since the previous January 1, through the act's tax credits.

In an October 2024 interview with reporter Emily Pontecorvo, Wally Adeyemo said he could not commit to a timeline for finalizing the tax credit rules on sustainable aviation fuel and electric vehicle charges, citing understaffing and the processing backlog of 30,000 comments on the clean hydrogen draft rule. On the 29th, the EPA and President Biden announced the 55 recipients of the $2.9 billion Clean Ports Program funded by the act; most of the money will go towards zero-emissions cargo handling equipment or shore power.

In November 2024, the DOE announced that $6.6 billion of funding from the act would be loaned to the automaker Rivian to complete its new plant in Georgia.

Solar for All was in the process of distributing the grants in February 2024 when newly appointed EPA Administrator Lee Zeldin announced he sought to instantly terminate roughly $20 billion in clean energy grant programs. However, the Environmental Protection Agency unfroze the $7 billion fund Solar for All program on March 4, 2025.

==== Ecosystems ====
In 2023 an agreement between seven states (Arizona, California, Colorado, Nevada, New Mexico, Utah, and Wyoming) was achieved, aiming to preserve the Colorado River water system from collapse due to poor management and climate change. The United States is heavily dependent on the river for power generation, drinking water, agriculture, wildlands restoration, and native cultural practices. Some states will reduce water use, receiving $1.2 billion in compensation for it from the federal government. Many other projects for preserving the river such as water recycling and rainwater harvesting are being advanced. The funding comes from the Infrastructure Investment and Jobs Act and the Inflation Reduction Act.

According to a Biden administration statement, in the first year of implementation, around $2 billion was allocated to protect and restore land and marine ecosystems, including National Parks and the National Wildlife Refuge System. In August 2023, $150 million was given to small and underserved forest owners, and intended to link them to climate markets, providing incentives to conserve the forests. Another $145 million were delivered with the same goal in March 2024. In October 2024, $265 million from the act was delivered, followed in December by $335 million, to private forest owners for similar projects in conservation.

In November 2023, the Biden administration announced it would provide the National Parks System $166 million for ecosystem resilience and environmental planning. In August 2024, the Biden administration provided the United States Fish and Wildlife Service $20 million from the act for helping preserve Southwest desert fish, moths, freshwater mussels, and Pacific island plants. In October, it provided the Regional Conservation Partnership Program within the USDA $1.5 billion from the act for 92 conservation projects around the country.

==== Sustainable agriculture ====
From October 2022 to September 2023 more than $850 million was given by the Natural Resources Conservation Service to its Environmental Quality Incentives Program, Conservation Stewardship Program, Regional Conservation Partnership Program and Agricultural Conservation Easement Program to advance sustainable agriculture.

In January 2024, Michael Happ of the Institute for Agriculture and Trade Policy found that the act's funding was able to support 2,366 more applicants to EQIP in 2023 compared to 2022, and 3,078 more applicants to the Conservation Stewardship Program across the same years; Happ, however, found that USDA resources such as staffing were often insufficient.

Journalist Michael Grunwald, writing in Canary Media a year later, revealed IRA agriculture funds were overall focused more on corporate farming-led soil carbon storage (which he claimed had less scientific rigor to back it) than on efficient methods to reduce methane and nitrous oxide emissions, the reason being that Agriculture Secretary Tom Vilsack's political considerations prevailed over White House climate adviser David Hayes' skeptical approach.

==== Environmental justice ====
In October 2023, the Environmental Protection Agency allocated $128 million to 186 projects linked to environmental justice. $104 million comes from the Inflation Reduction Act. The projects are designed to solve pollution and climate-related disasters in underserved communities. The projects include creating parks for addressing floods, protecting Duck Valley Indian Reservation natural and cultural resources, teaching children about repairing and more. The full list of projects with short descriptions has been published.

In November 2023, the Biden administration announced the Department of the Interior would be spending $20 million to establish the Kapapahuliau Climate Resilience Program, named for the process of navigating through rough seas and winds, to the Native Hawaiian community for climate adaptation and resilience. The deadline to apply for program award grants was February 29, 2024. It also announced the EPA would spend $2 billion on its new Community Change Grants Program for partnerships between local nonprofits, governments and indigenous tribes, and colleges and universities to "deploy clean energy, strengthen climate resilience, and build community capacity to respond to environmental and climate justice challenges". In July 2024 $34 million was allocated from this program to some communities in Alabama and Tennessee to improve wastewater and stormwater management, reconnect communities and expand urban green spaces.

=== Drug prices ===
The Biden administration announced the first ten drugs to have their prices negotiated in 2026 by Medicare on August 29, 2023. They are Eliquis, Jardiance, Xarelto, Januvia, Farxiga, Entresto, Enbrel, Imbruvica, Stelara, and Fiasp and NovoLog. The list selection, made by the Centers for Medicare & Medicaid Services, was based on whether these drugs lacked competition, how much they cost Medicare, and how long they have been on the market. The manufacturers, Bristol Myers Squibb, Boehringer Ingelheim, Janssen Pharmaceuticals, Merck, AstraZeneca, Novartis, Immunex, Pharmacyclics, and Novo Nordisk, had until October 1, 2023 to declare their intent to participate, upon penalty of a large excise tax, or they would withdraw their drugs from Medicaid and Medicare. The Biden administration announced two days later that all companies had agreed to the negotiations. The administration made its initial offer on February 1, 2024, as part of a negotiation process that continued until August 1, 2024.

The Medicare drug price negotiation provisions are facing eight protest lawsuits filed by drug manufacturers and the U.S. Chamber of Commerce, variously claiming that the federal government is violating the First, Fifth, and Eighth Amendments to the Constitution, which deal with freedom of speech, just compensation for takings, and excessive fines. Larry Gostin, a public health and legal scholar, told The New York Times that he does not expect the provisions to be upheld by the Supreme Court of the United States. A "second wave" of lawsuits, likely focusing on the price negotiations' bureaucratic process, was predicted to ensue, according to Stephen Ubl, CEO of the pharmaceutical industry lobbying group PhRMA. Some legal commentators speculate the cases are intended to produce a variety of rulings across the federal courts, making it more likely for the Supreme Court to hear them. While the healthcare consulting firm Avalere claimed in July 2022 that $455 billion in revenue would be lost by drug manufacturers and the trade group Vital Transformation claimed 139 fewer new drugs would be approved over the next decade due to the act, the Congressional Budget Office projects only one fewer drug will be approved than without the act over the next decade, five fewer over the succeeding decade, and seven fewer over the decade after that.

=== Health insurance subsidies ===
The Inflation Reduction Act extended the American Rescue Plan's modifications to the Affordable Care Act's health insurance subsidies, namely the Advanced Payment for Premium Tax Credit, through 2025. The Centers for Medicare & Medicaid Services attributed increases in ACA health insurance enrollment after the 2022 enrollment period in part to the IRA. The 2023 Open Enrollment period, the first one under the IRA, saw an increase in new consumers of 3,699,749, compared to the previous year's increase of 3,066,360. The CMS saw an increase in approvals for financial aid from the act (90% of consumers compared to 2021's 85%, meaning the act and ARP helped roughly 14.72 million people in calendar year 2022) and estimated national averages of $824 per year and 46% in IRA savings on premiums, in addition to finding that 1.4 million people making up to four times the poverty line were still able to access subsidies thanks to the ARP and IRA. The 2024 Open Enrollment period saw 5,215,764 new consumers sign up for the exchanges, an increase of 31% from the previous year's 3,699,749. 92% of consumers (roughly 19.73 million people) received aid from the act. The average annual premium savings figure now stood at $705 and 48%; the ARP and IRA had now helped 1.5 million people avoid subsidy ineligibility. The 2025 Open Enrollment period saw an increase in new consumers of 3,938,907, a slowdown from last year's figure. The IRA was credited with allowing 80 percent of users to find a plan for $10 a month or less.

=== IRS reform ===
Treasury Secretary Janet Yellen directed IRS commissioner Charles Rettig to not use the new funding allocated in the act to increase the rate of audits of those making less than $400,000 a year above historical levels, but to instead focus on "high-end noncompliance". A Treasury report indicated that half of the funding would be allocated to preventing tax evasion from large corporations and wealthy individuals.

Due to larger than expected use of the act's tax credits, the administration of Joe Biden has begun to reevaluate how much in unpaid taxes the IRS can collect to cover the costs. According to its new findings, full reorganization of the IRS will result in $851 billion in new revenue from 2024–2034 without having to add tax burdens to those who earn annual incomes less than $400,000; it notes that "the top 10 percent of the income distribution is responsible for 64 percent of unpaid taxes."

=== Per state ===
==== Florida ====
The state of Florida received $3.75 million for urban forests and nature conservation, $209,000 for fighting pollution, and $78.7 million to protect the state from climate change impacts (the third amount is from the Infrastructure Investment and Jobs Act and the Inflation Reduction Act combined).

However, Florida's governor, Ron DeSantis, refused to accept $346 million for rebates to homeowners who will want to retrofit their houses for energy efficiency, $3 million to fight pollution, a program for helping low income people buy solar panels as well as $24 million from the Infrastructure Investment and Jobs Act for improving sewage systems in rural areas. DeSantis later reversed course and attempted to reclaim some of the rejected home energy rebate funds.

The money can go to local cities and authorities. Three cities in Florida accepted some amounts. Other states want to take the money forfeited by Florida for themselves, namely Rhode Island and Kentucky.

The funds for the rebates were requested by the Florida state energy office and the legislature, but DeSantis vetoed them. He is the only governor who did so. The program was intended to help people to lower their energy bills and create jobs. Half of the money would have gone to low-income households. Making a house more energy efficient can cut utility bills by 25% for an average family in Florida. Part of the money would have gone to weatherization of houses.

==== Texas ====
Some aspects of the law are the same as in other states, while some are specific to Texas. Considerable tax credits and tax rebates are afforded. House weatherization, solar energy, electric vehicles, are advanced. House weatherization can save around $283 per year for an average family in Texas, while raising the value of the property and reducing air pollution in the same time. Some improvements can be made for free to low income households. The cost of an energy audit is reduced by 30% and some can even get it for free.

A third of Texas households can get a 100% rebate for installing a heat pump (generally costing US$8,000). Forest protection is advanced, and farms that adopt climate-friendly practices get economic incentives.

==== Alaska ====
In February 2024, $1 million was delivered to Alaska remote communities. The aim is to strengthen resilience and food security, improve cooperation with indigenous tribes, and use their knowledge.

== Reactions ==
Senator Joe Manchin (D-WV) issued a statement for his support of the bill. President Joe Biden also stated his support for the proposed Inflation Reduction Act. Later on, Biden said, "I wish I hadn't called it that because it has less to do with reducing inflation than it has to do with providing alternatives that generate economic growth."

On August 4, Senator Kyrsten Sinema (D-AZ) issued a statement indicating that she would support the bill after striking a deal with fellow Democrats to change several tax provisions.

Congressional Republicans voiced unanimous opposition to the bill, claiming the legislation would do little to combat inflation, or would exacerbate it. Senate minority leader Mitch McConnell (R-KY) denounced the legislation as "reckless spending" and Ranking Member of the Senate Budget Committee Lindsey Graham (R-SC) called it "insanity".

In a letter sent to congressional leadership and touted by Senate Democrats, 126 economists including Robert Rubin, Jack Lew, Jason Furman, Lawrence Summers, Mark Zandi, and Joseph Stiglitz, wrote that the bill is more than fully paid for, lowers prices for consumers and will lower inflation. Furman also said, "I can't think of any mechanism by which it would have brought down inflation to date."

In a letter sent to congressional leadership, 230 economists including Vernon Smith, Robert Heller, Kevin Hassett, and Jim Miller, wrote that the bill will increase prices for consumers and will increase inflation.

Tom Philpott, an agriculture journalist writing in Wired, praised the bill's investments in climate-smart agriculture and remedies for USDA loan discrimination, but heavily criticized Sinema's deletion of the carried interest loophole modification and the lack of provisions to expand funding for the National School Lunch Act and improvements to child nutrition (as expressed in the original Build Back Better Act) and for soil erosion prevention programs (which enhance small-scale carbon farming and encourage a shift away from monoculture-dependent farming for ethanol fuel in the United States).

=== Public organizations ===
Darren Woods, the CEO of oil and gas energy giant ExxonMobil, called the bill "a step in the right direction" and endorsed its provisions related to oil and gas. Multiple coal industry groups, including the West Virginia Coal Association, criticized the bill for "[obviating] any need to innovate coal assets" and doing "nothing for coal or coal generation".

Many mainstream environmental organizations supported the bill, such as the Nature Conservancy, the National Wildlife Federation, and American Forests. The director of North America policy for the Nature Conservancy, Tom Cors, called the legislation "historic", while Aviva Glaser of the NWF called the infusion of spending "transformative." The Natural Resources Defense Council argued that despite continued acceptance of fossil fuels in the IRA, its climate mitigation policies would outweigh their impact ten times over. Health and environmental justice organizations like Earthjustice have welcomed the law.

However, not all environmental groups expressed unqualified support. Some environmentalists noted that the bill contained more "carrots", or incentives for positive behavior, than "sticks", or new regulations. Several groups argued that as the legislation did not seek to eliminate fossil fuels entirely, it was inadequate to meet the threat of climate change. Jean Su, the energy justice program director at the Center for Biological Diversity, called the legislation "a backdoor take-it-or-leave-it deal between a coal baron and Democratic leaders in which any opposition from lawmakers or frontline communities was quashed." The Climate Justice Alliance criticized the IRA, saying that "the strengths of the IRA are outweighed by the bill's weaknesses and threats posed by the expansion of fossil fuels and unproven technologies such as carbon capture and hydrogen generation."

Cycling organizations criticized the IRA for removing the incentives for electric bicycles in the original Build Back Better Act, having a better energy-per-incentive ratio and reaching a wider demographic, than for electric cars remaining in the IRA. Sean Jeans-Gail, Vice President of Government Affairs and Policy at the Rail Passengers Association, criticized the IRA saying, "It's a bitter pill in terms of rail and transit, which is the one clearly established, low-carbon emission transportation systems we have going". He also criticized the bill for being car centric.

=== Relationship with foreign policy ===
Biden's national security advisor Jake Sullivan has been identified as the staffer in charge of ensuring the act does not conflict with American foreign policy interests.

Among American foreign policy analysts and officials, Anna McGinn of the think tank Environmental and Energy Study Institute praised the act for helping the U.S. meet its commitments to the Paris Agreement, but criticized the act for lacking commitments to loss and damage and other forms of climate-related foreign aid as well as to creating a cohesive national climate strategy. Jason Bordoff, writing on the International Monetary Fund's website, cautioned that it could expose the U.S. to the beginnings of trade war, but if implemented deftly, the act could strengthen diplomacy with Europe and help create special rules to advance the trade of clean energy. Commentators at the Center for Strategic International Studies and in The Diplomat, along with United States Trade Representative Katherine Tai and John Podesta himself have acknowledged increased economic competition with China as one of many motivators behind the act.

Internationally, reactions were mixed. Fatih Birol, the head of the International Energy Agency, called it "the single most important climate action since the Paris Agreement in 2015". However, some were concerned about the law's provisions favoring American industry. In an interview with Time Amitabh Kant, the chairman of the 2023 G20 meeting in India, called it "the most protectionist act ever drafted in the world", asking American officials, "You believed in market forces and now you do this?" Other countries have begun to create their own similar laws. China requested WTO dispute consultations with the United States.

27 European Union finance ministers have expressed "serious concerns" about the financial incentives of the Inflation Reduction Act, and are considering challenging it. They have listed at least nine points in the legislation, which they say could be in breach of World Trade Organization rules. They were opposed to the subsidies for consumers to buy North American-assembled electric cars, as EU officials believe the subsidies discriminate against European carmakers. One EU official told CNBC that, "there is a political consensus (among the 27 ministers) that this plan threatens the European industry" and its supply of raw materials. In February 2023, the European Commission announced it would propose the "Net Zero Industrial Act", similar to the IRA, in turn putting pressure on the United Kingdom and South Korea.

On March 10, 2023, President Biden and President of the European Commission Ursula von der Leyen announced they would be initiating top-level talks to mitigate issues of subsidy competition.

Representatives from South Korea have also voiced similar concerns to Europe, given that the legislation can also restrict Hyundai's and other South Korean carmakers' business in the American market.

=== Implementation criticisms, concerns ===
==== Relationship with asset managers ====
Geographer and political writer Brett Christophers pointed out, after a renewables project was funded by Brookfield Corporation upon the act's passage, that asset management companies would likely see the act as a windfall for taking over public works, citing their poor track records with British and South Korean infrastructure and American housing.

==== Labor rules ====
Some members of the trade union United Auto Workers, including former vice president Cindy Estrada, have obliquely commented to The American Prospect that the Inflation Reduction Act's implementation regarding prevailing wage requirements and collective bargaining rights (particularly at electric vehicle factories owned by startup companies) may be weakened, and if not properly implemented, the act could be linked to poor hiring practices and working conditions. Other labor union representatives, from the AFL–CIO, Southwest Laborers District Council, Ironworkers Local 848 and United Steelworkers, told Reuters in March 2023 that investments announced due to the act have not improved labor unions' ability to organize particularly in right-to-work law states, but that they were hopeful in pushing ahead.

==== Environmental justice concerns ====
Climate activists Miriam Nielsen, Raya Salter and Heather Tanana examined the act's effects eight months after passage, and raised questions on whether the act would provide tax credits and grants equitably, mentioning the home energy upgrade grants and the Biden administration's Justice40 initiative for racial justice, whether the act would disproportionately help larger environmental groups with more resources rather than smaller ones, and how it would implement $4 billion in Western drought resilience grants and make accessing them easier.

==== EV rules ====
The Prospect's editor, Robert Kuttner, commented in January 2023 that the Treasury Department's interpretation of the act regarding electric vehicle leasing could also potentially undermine the act's U.S. domestic supply provisions in favor of European or Chinese suppliers. Manchin expressed disappointment with the Treasury's new guidance and its more lenient provisions for foreign trading partners upon its release on March 31. On December 18, he wrote a letter to Gene Dodaro, head of the Government Accountability Office, asking for a legal opinion on if Congress can overturn the Treasury guidance on Section 30D, on the basis that it is technically a proposal and not finalized, but is being enforced as the latter.

==== Clean hydrogen rules ====
On December 13, 2023, Manchin also expressed his disappointment with the Biden administration's implementation of his Section 45V tax credit for clean hydrogen after the draft guidelines were leaked, claiming it was "horrible" and too stringent beyond his intent for the credit. Manchin later said he would bring a lawsuit against the Biden administration upon release of the guidelines. Constellation Energy, the United States' largest nuclear power plant operator, said it would pull back on green and pink hydrogen projects if the guidelines were released. Staffers for Governor Gavin Newsom (D-CA) also asked the Treasury Department in May 2024 for an "alternative compliance pathway" that lifted emissions restrictions on the state's hydrogen hub, ostensibly to better align with their 100% renewable energy adoption goal. Lobbying against the proposed Treasury rules has only intensified since then, according to Pontecorvo. In her interview with Deputy Treasury Secretary Wally Adeyemo, Adeyemo promised a "middle of the road" approach between environmentalists' and Manchin and lobbyists' concerns, in the run-up to the tax credit's finalization, then expected by December 2024.

On January 3, 2025, the Treasury Department finalized the 45V credit's rules. Most environmental groups that commented, and Governor Newsom's administration, praised them, though expressed concern about its new exemptions and delaying of the hourly matching provision, while industry groups were more cautious in welcoming them.

==== Sustainable aviation fuel rules ====
In April 2024, the Section 40B tax credit guidance was released. While biofuel producers, trade groups and United and American Airlines fully welcomed the guidance, farmers and lower-level ethanol producers said the guidance was too prescriptive and did not reflect the full range of agricultural approaches to climate policy, while environmentalists criticized the guidance for not going far enough to account for all lifecycle emissions from ethanol fuel.

== Trump administration actions ==
On January 20–23, 2025, the Trump administration issued executive direction leading federal agencies to pause disbursements and payments of funds appropriated under the IRA and the Infrastructure Investment and Jobs Act. The directive instructed agency heads to review grants, loans, contracts, and other disbursements to determine consistency with the administration's policy priorities and temporarily halted payments to recipients that had already been awarded funding.

Later in 2025, the U.S. Environmental Protection Agency, under Administrator Lee Zeldin, took steps to terminate or retract certain IRA-funded grant programs. Among these actions were efforts to cancel awards under the Greenhouse Gas Reduction Fund (GGRF) and reports that EPA was drafting termination notices for awards under the Solar for All program, totaling billions of dollars in climate-related grants. These internal agency actions have been the subject of separate litigation and legal challenge.

On April 15, 2025, federal judge Mary McElroy of Rhode Island ruled in a case brought by local conservation groups that some of the act's funding had to be unfrozen nationwide. On the same day, District of Columbia federal judge Tanya Chutkan issued a preliminary injunction forcing the EPA and the Treasury Department's designated distributor, Citibank, to unfreeze the Greenhouse Gas Reduction Fund.

In a court filing for another case involving New England conservation groups, the EPA indicated it would plan to cut 781 further environmental justice grants related to the IRA and other Biden-era policies.

The One Big Beautiful Bill Act repealed many IRA provisions. In 2026, numerous reports came out evaluating the impact of the OBBBA on clean energy investments in the United States. One study projected the IRA's impact on clean energy investments would be nearly wiped out by the OBBBA, and emissions would be reduced by only 34 percent below 2005 levels, compared to 44 percent with the IRA. A July 2026 estimate by the group E2 found that the OBBBA had eliminated a projected 467,000 jobs for green-collar workers and caused a $68.2 billion reduction in capital investments, with grid storage batteries and solar power being the most affected industries. A report that month released by environmental group BlueGreen Alliance found that the OBBBA caused 223 manufacturing and clean energy projects to stall or be cancelled, affecting over 111,000 jobs and $82.9 billion in investment. However, Lily Bermel of Columbia University, writing for MIT, estimated that 67-74 percent of the clean energy production gains spurred by the IRA would be retained due to robust domestic demand, though the most adversely affected sector would be onshore wind.

In September 2026, Judge McElroy restored funding to the Solar for All program after ruling on a lawsuit by environmental groups that Trump's EPA administrator Lee Zeldin froze the funds illegally, stating Congress was obliged to continue its spending on the program even after the OBBBA repealed it.

== See also ==
- List of acts of the 117th United States Congress
- Climate change policy of the United States
- Energy in the United States
- Energy policy of the United States, including the Infrastructure Investment and Jobs Act and CHIPS and Science Act
- Environmental policy of the Joe Biden administration
- List of tie-breaking votes cast by the vice president of the United States
- 2021–2023 inflation
