= Energy Savings and Industrial Competitiveness Act of 2013 =

Bill of the U.S. Congress

- Long title: To promote energy savings in residential buildings and industry, and for other purposes.
- Announced in: the 113th United States Congress
- Sponsored by: Senator Jeanne Shaheen (D-NH)
- Number of co-sponsors: 1

Codification
- Acts affected: Energy Conservation and Production Act, Energy Policy Act of 1992, Energy Independence and Security Act of 2007, Energy Policy and Conservation Act, Higher Education Act of 1965, and others.
- U.S.C. sections affected: 42 U.S.C. § 6834, 42 U.S.C. § 17111, 42 U.S.C. § 6348, 42 U.S.C. § 13453, 40 U.S.C. § 3307, and others
- Agencies affected: United States Congress, National Institute of Standards and Technology, United States Department of Veterans Affairs, General Services Administration, Small Business Administration, United States Department of Energy, National Energy Technology Laboratory, United States Department of Defense
- Authorizations of appropriations: $1,180,000,000

Legislative history
- Introduced in the Senate as S. 1392 by Senator Jeanne Shaheen (D-NH) on July 30, 2013

The Energy Savings and Industrial Competitiveness Act of 2013 (S. 1392) is a bill that was introduced into the United States Senate during the 113th United States Congress. The overall purpose of the bill was to reduce energy waste by increasing energy efficiency in the United States. Among its many provisions, the bill includes measures to improve building codes, assist manufactures in becoming more energy efficient, and increase conservation efforts at federal agencies.

== Provisions of the bill ==
Note: This summary is based largely on the summary provided by the Congressional Research Service, a public domain source.

The Energy Savings and Industrial Competitiveness Act of 2013 would amend the Energy Conservation and Production Act to direct the Secretary of Energy (DOE) to: (1) support the development and updating of national model building energy codes for residential and commercial buildings to enable the achievement of aggregate energy savings targets established by this Act, (2) encourage and support the adoption by states and local governments of building energy codes that meet or exceed the national codes, and (3) support full compliance with state and local codes.

The bill would direct the Secretary to provide grants to establish building training and assessment centers at institutions of higher learning to identify and promote opportunities, concepts, and technologies for expanding building energy and environmental performance. It would also require the Secretary to make grants to eligible nonprofit partnerships to pay the federal share of career skills training programs to help students obtain a certification to install energy efficient buildings technologies.

The Energy Savings and Industrial Competitiveness Act of 2013 would amend the Energy Independence and Security Act of 2007 to: (1) replace references to the energy-intensive industries program with references to the future of industry program, and (2) reduce the amount authorized to be appropriated for the Zero Net Energy Commercial Buildings Initiative for FY2015-FY2018.

The bill would require the Administrator of the Small Business Administration (SBA) to expedite consideration of applications from eligible small businesses for loans under the Small Business Act to implement recommendations of industrial research and assessment centers.

The Energy Savings and Industrial Competitiveness Act of 2013 would amend the Energy Policy and Conservation Act to require the Secretary: (1) as part of the Office of Energy Efficiency and Renewable Energy, to conduct on-site technical assessments at the request of a manufacturer to identify opportunities for maximizing the energy efficiency of industrial processes and cross-cutting systems, preventing pollution and minimizing waste, improving efficient use of water in manufacturing processes, and conserving natural resources; and (2) as part of the DOE's industrial efficiency programs, to carry out an industry-government partnership program to research, develop, and demonstrate new sustainable manufacturing and industrial technologies and processes that maximize the energy efficiency of industrial systems, reduce pollution, and conserve natural resources.

The bill would establish within the DOE a Supply Star program to identify and promote practices, recognize companies, and recognize products that use highly efficient supply chains that conserve energy, water, and other resources.

The bill would also direct the Secretary to establish a rebate program for expenditures for the purchase and installation of: (1) a new constant speed electric motor control that is attached to an electric motor and reduces motor energy use by at least 5%; and (2) commercial or industrial machinery or equipment that is manufactured and incorporates an advanced motor and drive system that has greater than one horsepower into a redesigned machine or equipment that did not previously make use of the system or was previously used and placed back into service in 2014 or 2015 that upgrades the existing machine or equipment with such system.

The bill would direct the Secretary to establish a rebate program for expenditures made by owners of industrial or manufacturing facilities, commercial buildings, and multifamily residential buildings for the purchase and installation of new energy efficient transformers. It would terminate the program on December 31, 2015.

The bill also directs the Secretary to issue guidance for federal agencies to employ advanced tools promoting energy efficiency and energy savings through the use of information and communications technologies.

The bill would authorize the Administrator of the General Services Administration (GSA), for any building project for which congressional approval has been received and the design has been substantially completed, but the construction of which has not begun, to use appropriated funds to update the building's design to meet energy efficiency and other standards for new federal buildings.

Finally, the bill would require the Administrator for the Office of E-Government and Information Technology within the Office of Management and Budget (OMB) to develop and publish a goal for the total amount of planned energy and cost savings and increased productivity by the government through the consolidation of federal data centers during the next five years. It would provide that such goal does not apply to the High Performance Computing Modernization Program of the United States Department of Defense (DOD).

== Procedural history ==
=== Senate ===
The Energy Savings and Industrial Competitiveness Act of 2013 was introduced into the Senate on July 30, 2013, by Senator Jeanne Shaheen (D-NH). On September 11, 2013, the Senate voted by unanimous consent to proceed to consideration of the measure and began consideration on September 12, 2013.

=== President ===
On September 11, 2013, President Barack Obama's office released a Statement of Administration Policy on S. 1392, in which the Administration indicated that they support S. 1392. The Administration argued that the bill "complements key energy efficiency dimensions of the President’s Climate Action Plan."

== Debate and discussion ==
In a joint op-ed for Politico, Senators Jeanne Shaheen and Rob Portman wrote that their bills "will go a long way toward making the United States more energy efficient and more economically competitive." The two argued that their "bill curbs inefficient energy practices that cost the U.S. economy billions of dollars and millions of jobs every year." The two also argue that their bill makes use of voluntary measures to accomplish these savings.

== See also ==
- List of bills in the 113th United States Congress
- United States Department of Energy
- Energy in the United States
- Efficient energy use
- Energy conservation in the United States
- Energy policy of the United States
