= Home energy upgrades from public utilities =

HVAC and power improvements to residences offered by service providers

Home energy upgrades from public utilities are added home energy efficiency and renewable energy features planned or installed by public utilities. Help from a public utility can make it easier for a homeowner to select, install or operate climate-friendly components. The utility might assist with coordinated use of utility-supplied energy, building features, financing, operating options and neighborhood supplied energy.

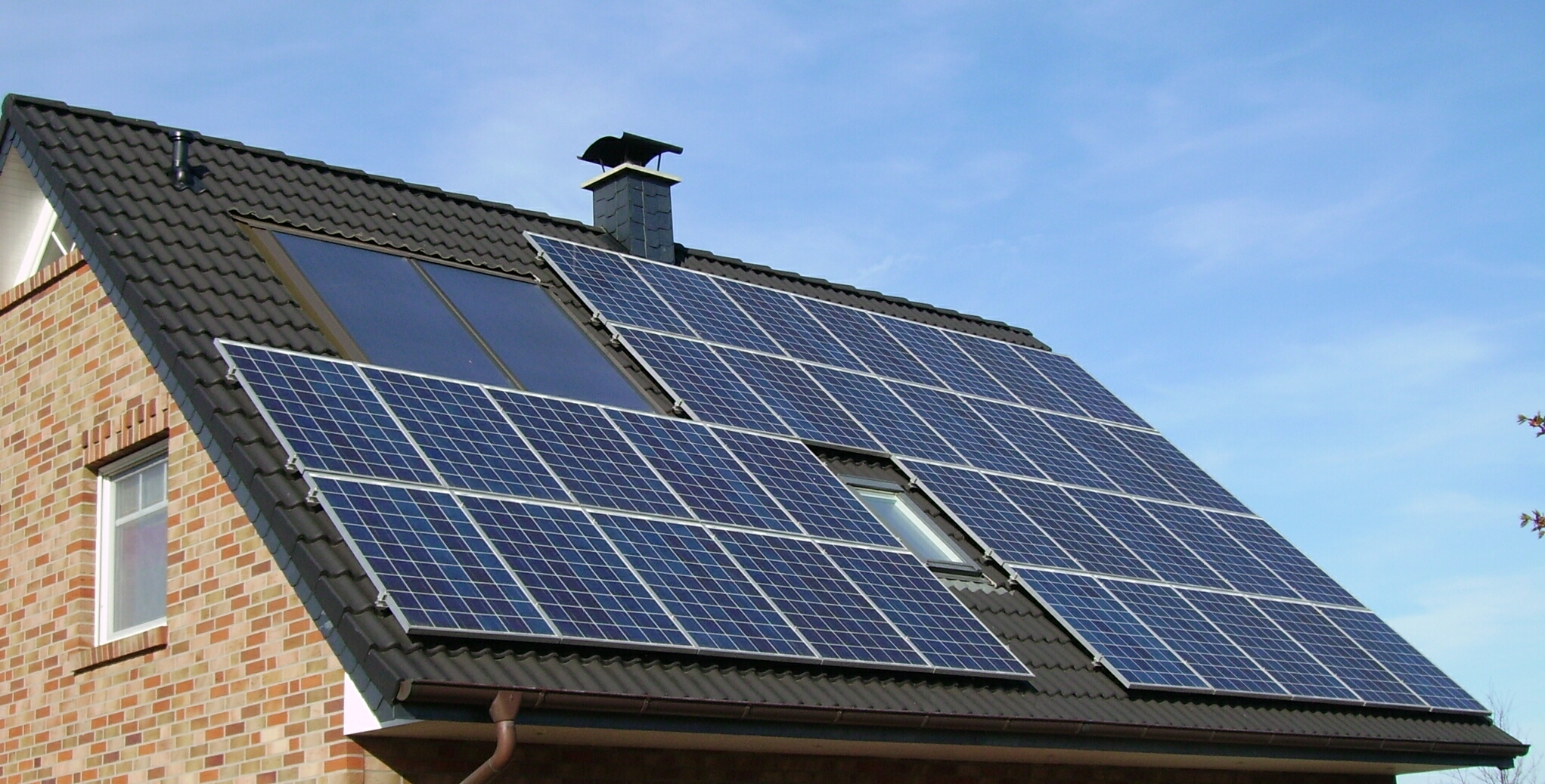
Home solar panels: a renewable energy upgrade

== Current programs ==
Various public utilities, related organizations and governments have started or considered programs offering home energy upgrades from public utilities.

=== Australia ===
In 2016 Greentech Media reported that Australian utilities were starting to offer home battery upgrades as a way to participate in a growing home battery storage market. Sellers of home storage batteries partnered with public utilities. By 2018 utilities were seeking a closer relationship with homeowners whose home storage batteries could help balance grid load and thus reduce the need for new conventional power plants.

=== The Bahamas ===
==== Ragged Island ====
Ragged Island is an out island in The Bahamas archipelago. Ragged Island's electricity was originally provided using diesel generators. After the passage of hurricane Irma, the Bahamas Power and Light Company (BPL) developed a project to implement a Ragged Island microgrid that includes renewable energy. This microgrid offers protection from natural disasters and fuel price changes.

The microgrid construction was undertaken by Tugliq Energy and its construction partner Salt Energy. The project includes design, procurement, installation and a year's operation of a solar-battery microgrid coupled with the existing diesel plant. The microgrid has a solar capacity of 402 kWp.

The Ragged Island microgrid has been viewed as a proven standard model for rapid development of similar facilities worldwide.

=== China ===
In 2016 China implemented a Standard for Energy Consumption of Residential Buildings, a critical step to guide property developers and owners. The Rocky Mountain Institute observed that "no other countries with building stock volume similar to China’s had released a similar national standard".

=== Colombia ===
==== Antioquia ====
As explained in its 2020 website, the public utility of the Colombian city of Medellín, Empresas Publicas de Medellín (EPM), supported the city's efforts to be sustainable, focusing on providing low income residents with security, opportunity, a healthy environment and healthcare. Major Medellín programs have included construction of library parks, development of parks and urban green areas, development of plazas, and construction of an accessible and efficient transit system.

=== France ===
On its website in 2020, Électricité de France (EDF) affirmed its commitment to putting residential customers' energy-saving plans into practice. EDF stated that it provides smart meters and ability to monitor energy consumption from computers or smartphones. EDF's website explains that residential customers "who want to invest in saving energy need look no further than EDF for precisely the right services and advice, from a home energy performance assessment to advice on heating systems (smart radiators, heat pumps, solar water heating, etc.) and the installation of energy-efficient solutions (LED lighting and heating system regulators and programmers)".

=== India ===
In September 2016 the Climate Policy Initiative published an analysis of challenges facing India if its national and state governments and public utilities were to help property owners install rooftop solar projects. Considered help included financing, net metering, and installation. Participating organizations would be the Ministry of New and Renewable Energy, the Climate Policy Initiative, India's state governments, and state-level public electricity distribution companies.

=== United States ===
Many programs have started in the United States.

U.S. presidential candidate Joe Biden called attention to his climate change plan in July 2020. In December 2020 President Biden nominated key cabinet members and officials to implement climate policy.

The Biden plan observed that “local housing authorities and utility companies have stepped up and helped households invest in energy-efficient upgrades by offering flexible financing plans and tax credits”.

Biden's plan included incentives for efficiency improvements, appliance electrification, and on-site clean power generation. The plan called for developing “a package of affordable energy efficiency retrofits” and for changing building codes to increase the energy efficiency of new buildings.

To encourage charging of electric vehicles at off-peak times, many public utilities in the United States have offered rebates for purchase or installation of home electric vehicle charging equipment.

==== Alaska ====
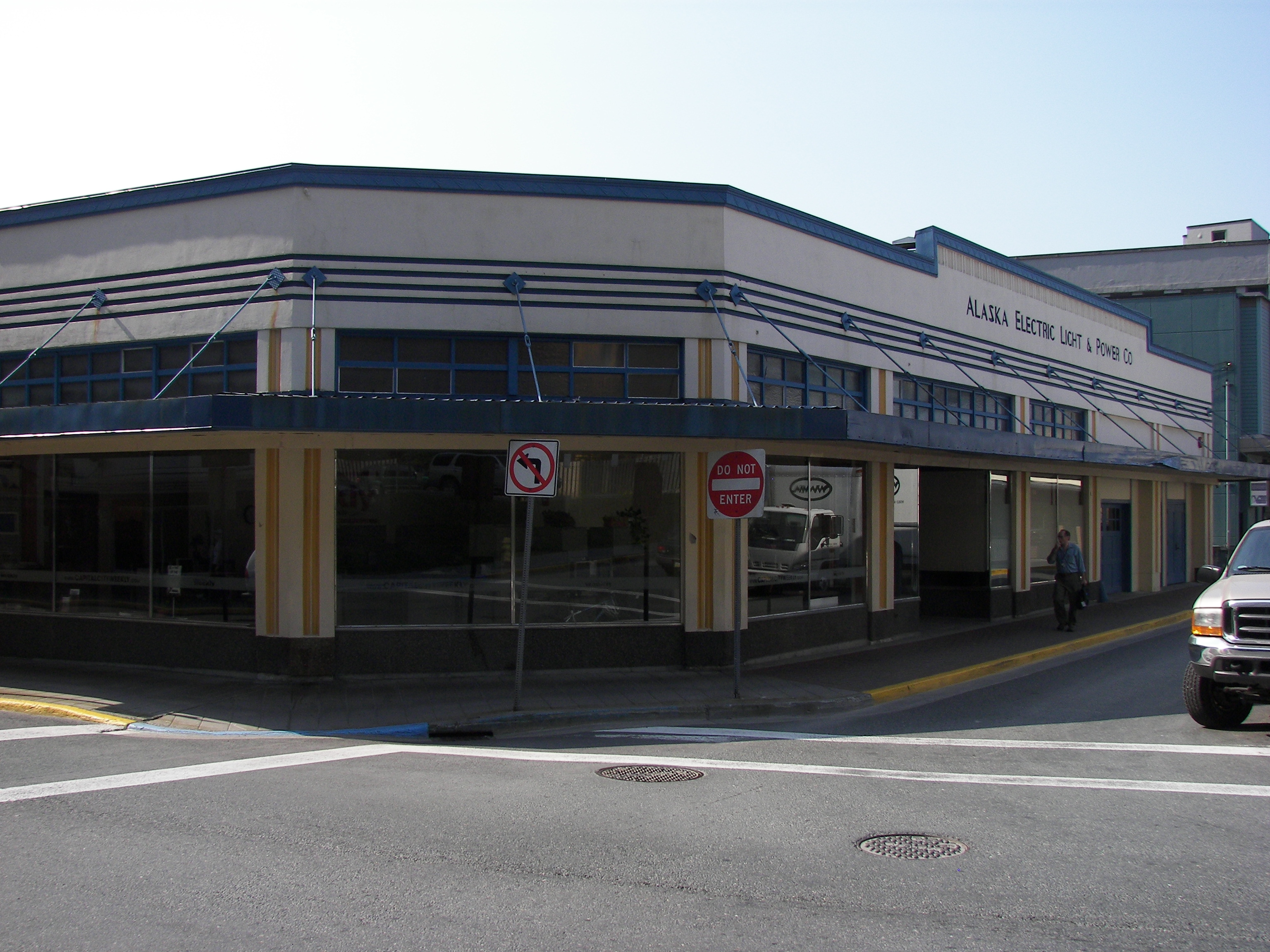
Alaska Electric Light & Power building on Franklin Street in downtown Juneau, Alaska in 2009

In 2018, Alaska’s capital city Juneau considered easing itself away from heating oil by using heat pumps powered from hydroelectricity. The local utility, Alaska Electric Light & Power, planned the first steps toward encouraging customers to install heat pumps. Heat pump installations may be air sourced or geothermal. (Available videos describe both air source and geothermal installations.)

==== California ====
The California Public Utilities Commission has helped builders to construct new homes that contribute as much energy to the public utilities as they extract from them. In 2018 California recognized a goal to have 100% of new homes at Zero Net Energy beginning in 2020. The Energy Upgrade California program’s 2018 website offered coordinated help for owners of existing homes.

Data reported for the period from January 2016 through March 2017 indicates that residential efficiency efforts of the major California public utilities had saved enough electricity to provide electricity for about 112,000 typical US homes, and had saved enough natural gas to supply natural gas to about 53,000 typical US homes.

In 2017 Pacific Gas and Electric provided a simple procedure for homeowners wanting to install electric vehicle charging connections. This is an example of how public utilities can assist with electric vehicle charging upgrades. The procedure includes selection of low cost and climate friendly electric rate plans.

Anaheim Public Utilities’ battery storage program has included household rebates of up to about $3,000 with a system for “storing energy when the sun is out and using it when it's not”. In 2021 Anaheim's residential and commercial solar programs were producing about 50,000,000 kilowatt hours (kWh) of electricity annually, enough to provide year around electricity for about 4,700 typical US homes.

The Center for Sustainable Energy (CSE) has helped California utilities to implement homeowner assistance programs. In 2020 CSE's client list included Southern California Edison, San Diego Gas & Electric, and Pacific Gas & Electric.

==== Colorado ====
The Efficiency Works program began in northern Colorado in 2014, offered by Estes Park Light & Power, Fort Collins Utilities, Longmont Power & Communications, Loveland Water and Power, and Platte River Power Authority. On its website, Efficiency Works stated that it "has achieved energy savings equivalent to the average energy use of 10,000 homes in our communities, and we plan to continue increasing our energy savings goals each year" (as of December 31, 2017).

In 2018 Efficiency Works’ website explained that the program assesses efficiency of a customer's home, assigns an efficiency adviser who walks the homeowner through the upgrade process from start to finish, and coordinates an energy audit. The program guides a utility's customers, residential and commercial, in a wide range of topics including installation strategies, on-site solar generation, and battery storage. In 2017, Fort Collins Utilities identified important features and issues for Efficiency Works to succeed, including finding the best ways to invite customers to participate, assuring the quality of contractor work, and providing an assigned impartial adviser to coordinate all work for a given home.

Xcel Energy, a major central states public utility, served customers in various locations throughout Colorado in 2018. Xcel's efficiency programs have helped Colorado homes upgrade appliances, lighting, and energy use monitoring - as well as Heating, Ventilation and Air Conditioning systems. Xcel's reported energy savings in 2019, due to its assistance to customers (both residential and business), indicate electricity savings sufficient to supply about 55,600 typical US homes with electricity, and natural gas savings sufficient to supply about 10,600 typical US homes with natural gas.

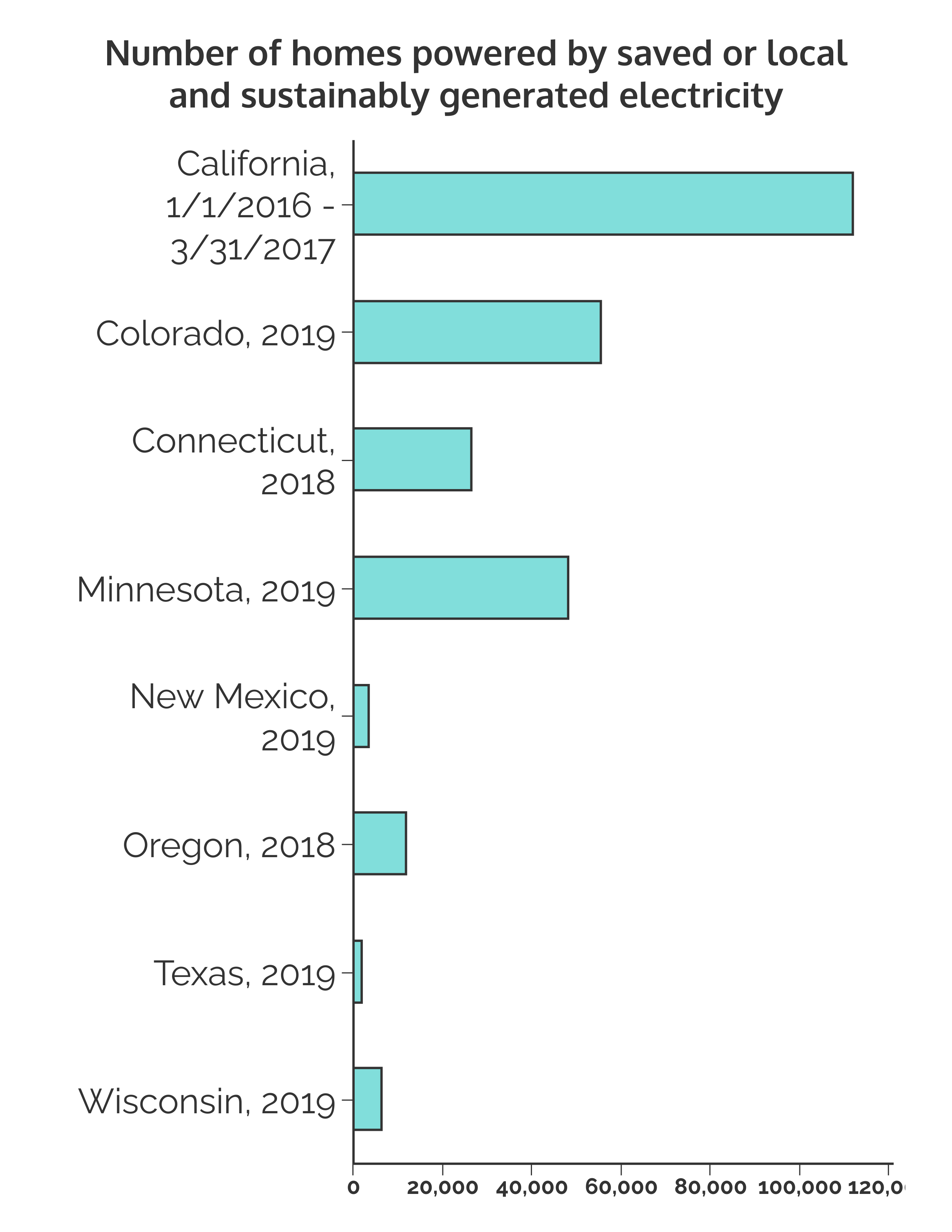
Electricity Savings

==== Connecticut ====
As explained on the Energize Connecticut website in 2020, Energize Connecticut has helped public utilities in the state of Connecticut to actively assist homeowners who want to save money and use clean energy. The website discusses how Energize Connecticut programs are structured. Energy professionals make improvements that lower energy bills for immediate and long term-savings.

Homeowner assistance can begin with a pre-assessment via live, virtual discussions with a technician at no cost. An Energize video shows how the energy assessment process works (safety protocols are observed during COVID-19).

Energize Connecticut is an initiative of the Energy Efficiency Fund, the Connecticut Green Bank, the State of Connecticut, local electric utilities and local gas utilities. The guiding board for Energize Connecticut's key funding reported that, in 2018, its residential programs saved 277,000 megawatt hours of electricity (enough electricity to supply about 26,600 typical homes in the United States) and 6,800,000 CCF of natural gas (enough natural gas to supply about 11,100 typical homes in the United States).

==== Florida ====
As of March 2021 Solar United Neighbors (SUN) arranged group purchases of home solar panel installations for 60 groups of homes in Florida. Group purchases are designed to help homeowners take action and obtain quality installations at competitive prices. The Alachua County Solar Co-op of 2017, one of SUN's largest group purchases in Florida, installed solar panels at 81 homes.

Florida Public Utilities (FPU) has sent energy experts to customers' homes to evaluate energy use, as described on the utility's website in 2019. During a free visit, an Energy Expert reviews a home's energy use and evaluates the energy efficiency of walls, windows, insulation, appliances, lighting and other features. The homeowner also receives help applying for rebates on high-efficiency upgrades that can add comfort and value.

As a part of Chesapeake Utilities, FPU has distributed natural gas, propane and electricity in various locations in Florida.

==== Michigan ====
As mentioned on the Xcel Energy utility's 2019 website, Xcel has provided customers with energy saving assistance. In Michigan Xcel has served several communities south of Lake Superior. In 2019, Xcel's assistance programs in Michigan saved enough electricity to supply about 150 typical US homes and enough natural gas to supply about 96 typical US homes. Xcel Energy has been a part of Michigan's Efficiency United collective that has informed residential and commercial customers about energy efficiency and has offered cost-effective solutions and rebates for reducing energy use.

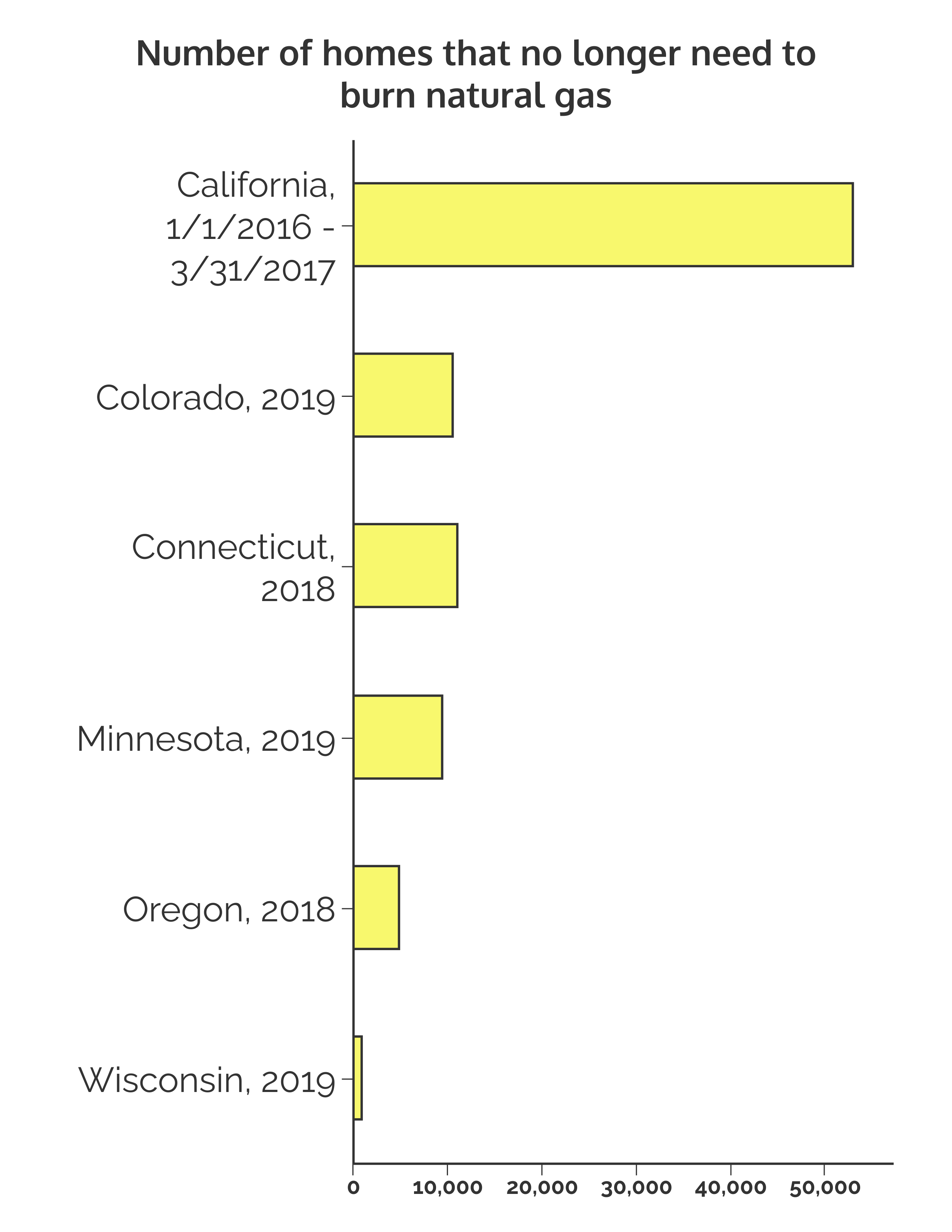
Natural Gas Savings

==== Minnesota ====
In 2019 Xcel Energy's home and business efficiency programs in Minnesota saved enough electricity to supply electricity to about 48,300 typical US homes. These programs also saved enough natural gas to supply natural gas for about 9,530 typical US homes. Xcel offered its customers “more control and new options for using and managing energy”. The utility began tracking results for its efficiency assistance programs in 1992.

Xcel's Minnesota Home Energy Squad, One-Stop Efficiency Shop and Partners in Energy programs received the 2019 Exemplary Program Award from the American Council for an Energy-Efficient Economy (ACEEE). In 2018 Xcel was acknowledged to be the first major, multi-state U.S. utility to commit to 100 percent carbon-free electricity by 2050. In addition to serving customers within a large area of Minnesota, Xcel has provided service in Michigan, Wisconsin, North Dakota, South Dakota, Colorado, Texas and New Mexico.

Xcel worked with Google to develop new ways for customers to manage their energy use. Customers have talked to Google Assistant to ask Xcel for energy-saving tips.

Utility help to set up home electric vehicle charging was underway in Minnesota from Xcel Energy in 2019. The effort includes providing car dealerships with tools and training to advise electric car buyers about how to charge their cars at home. Xcel installs home chargers capable of charging at times when electric rates are lowest.

==== New Mexico ====
Xcel Energy reported its assistance to customers in eastern New Mexico saved a total of 39.4 GWh of electricity in 2019 (enough electricity to supply about 3,590 typical homes in the United States).

==== North Dakota ====
In North Dakota in 2019, Xcel Energy helped residential customers do home energy audits. Xcel served electric and natural gas customers in the Fargo, Grand Forks and Minot areas of North Dakota. The natural gas savings reported by Xcel for its business and residential assistance programs in 2019 would have been sufficient to supply about 276 typical US homes with natural gas.

==== Oregon ====
In the state of Oregon, the Energy Trust of Oregon reported in its 2019 annual report that it is overseen by the Oregon Public Utility Commission. Funded from small charges on utility bills, the Energy Trust of Oregon helped public utilities offer customers efficiency advice, contracting assistance, cash incentives and financing. In 2018 Energy Trust of Oregon programs saved enough grid supplied electricity to power about 12,100 typical US homes, and saved enough natural gas to supply about 4,900 typical US homes.

The Portland General Electric (PGE) public utility distributed about one third of Oregon's electricity in 2017. In 2018 PGE announced a smart grid test bed to prepare for the utility's routine use of smart grids. A smart grid can, for example, pre-heat or pre-cool a home so that less energy is needed during a peak time. If many homes shifted energy use away from peak times, the utility would not have to build a new fossil fueled power plant just for the handful of hottest or coldest days each year.

PGE's October 2018 press release stated that the test bed project "aims to accelerate PGE’s vision for a clean energy future through partnering with customers to decarbonize the grid". The test bed includes three smart grids to serve more than 20,000 customers. The test bed will make additional renewable energy sources available for a home's use.

==== South Dakota ====
Xcel Energy’s South Dakota business and residential assistance programs in 2019 saved enough electricity to supply about 747 typical US homes with electricity. Xcel encouraged its electricity customers to be energy efficient by upgrading lighting and by shifting their use of electricity away from peak times.

==== Texas ====
In 2019, Xcel Energy offered energy efficiency guidance to its Texas business and residential customers that helped them to save enough electricity to supply about 2,130 typical US homes. Xcel served communities in the northern part of Texas, where Xcel had about 262,000 customers.

==== Vermont ====
In Vermont, starting in 2017, the Green Mountain Power (GMP) public utility helped its residential customers to install Tesla Powerwall 2.0 batteries in their homes. Using Tesla’s software platform, GMP could aggregate 2,000 Powerwall home batteries in the utility's pilot program to reduce system-wide peak load by 10 MW, which was the equivalent of removing about 7,500 homes from the grid at peak times.

==== Washington ====
Clark Public Utilities in southwestern Washington state offered many programs to help make customers’ homes both energy-efficient and comfortable in 2019. Available energy counselors help homeowners explore options.

In 2019 Clark offered financing to its residential customers for heat pumps, weatherization, rooftop solar, and solar water heaters. Clark's New Construction programs provide energy efficiency guidance and incentives to new home builders and to manufactured home builders, retailers and buyers.

==== Wisconsin ====
In 2019, the electricity savings reported for Xcel Energy's residential and business efficiency assistance programs in Wisconsin were enough to supply electricity for about 6,460 typical US homes. Similarly, reported natural gas savings were sufficient to supply natural gas to about 1,050 homes. Xcel cooperated with a statewide program, Focus on Energy, to offer incentives to Wisconsin residents and businesses for installing cost-effective energy efficiency and renewable energy projects. Xcel served many communities in Wisconsin in 2019.

== Business model ==
A business model, Integrated Utility Services, was described by Rocky Mountain Institute in 2014.

== Economics ==
Rocky Mountain Institute published a revenue and cost estimate in December 2014, developed by participants from Rocky Mountain Institute, Fort Collins Utilities, Brendle Group, Colorado Clean Energy Cluster and Telluride Research Group. The estimate indicated that a public utility can offer home energy upgrades that are as profitable to the utility as the profit from conventional utility-supplied electricity and natural gas. The published analysis projected that with substantial sale of home energy upgrades, Fort Collins Utilities' total income from services to single-family homes would increase slightly, with income as a percentage of revenue rising from 8% to 12%.

== Upgrades ==
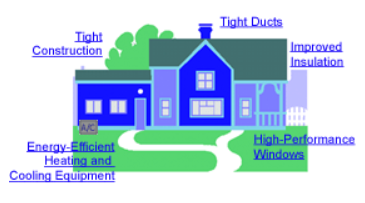
House energy efficiency features

Utilities can help homeowners to choose upgraded features in new homes, or to do green retrofits of existing homes.

Examples of new home features include energy efficient orientation and thermal mass walls. Use of home Geothermal Heat Pumps (heating and/or cooling systems that transfer heat to or from the ground) can be attractive for a public utility by reducing demand for energy from the grid at peak times, enabling the utility to avoid building new power plants.

Retrofit examples include sealing air leaks, installing building insulation, and replacing or repairing windows. A utility can help homeowners install solar panels, either directly at their homes or indirectly at a community solar farm. Households can add batteries to their solar panel systems.

Installing home charging connections for plug-in electric vehicles (PEVs) encourages PEV use.

== See also ==
- Efficient energy use
- Green building
