= Portland Energy Conservation =

PECI
- Company type: Non-profit
- Founded: Portland, Oregon (1979)
- Founder: City of Portland
- Headquarters: 100 SW Main St, Suite 1500, Portland, Oregon One Sansome St, Suite 3500, San Francisco, CA, USA
- Website: PECI.org

PECI is a private, non-profit American company based in Portland, Oregon with additional offices in Santa Ana, California and San Francisco, California. PECI designs and manages energy efficiency programs for utility providers, government organizations, and other clients. Some of the organizations PECI has worked with include the U.S. Department of Energy, Avista, Wal-mart, Southern California Edison, the Community Energy Project, Energy Trust of Oregon, Pacific Gas & Electric and the San Diego Natural History Museum.

As energy consumption rises, governments and utility companies are looking for ways to meet demand without creating energy-generating infrastructure. Meanwhile, many businesses are looking to reduce overhead costs by lowering their energy consumption. PECI designs tactics that encourage commercial businesses and residential consumers to adopt energy-efficient technology and behaviors, and manages the programmatic framework to implement these tactics on an appropriate scale.

On September 16, 2014, PECI announced that its current assets and contracts had been acquired by CLEAResult Consulting, a for-profit company that designs, markets and implements energy programs for utilities, businesses and residential energy customers. Ownership of the PECI name and brand remains with the PECI board of directors.

== History ==
Originally called Portland Energy Conservation, Inc., PECI was created by the city of Portland in 1979 as a public agency tasked with carrying out private sector aspects of the Portland Energy Conservation Policy. In 1984, PECI was spun off from city government into a private, non-profit company with 12 employees.

In 1990, PECI managed the Energy Edge program for the Administration. The intent of Energy Edge was to learn how energy-efficient lighting, refrigeration, and HVAC measures performed in commercial buildings. In addition to being PECI's first commercial energy efficiency program, Energy Edge was a landmark event in the creation of building commissioning processes. PECI's first energy efficiency program for residential consumers was the ENERGY STAR CFL program, which was launched in 1995 and operated throughout the Pacific Northwest.

By 2002, PECI was focusing on program designs that could be more easily replicated for different markets. A program called EnergySmart Grocer provides no-cost energy audits to supermarkets, convenience stores, and restaurants. Based on the results of the audit, the business can elect to install energy efficient refrigeration, lighting, HVAC, and food service equipment. The cost of the installation is offset by financial incentives from the utility company, allowing businesses to see the benefits of energy- and cost-saving technology while minimizing the cost of the upfront investment. Since 2006, EnergySmart Grocer programs have saved 227 million kWh of electricity in the Pacific Northwest.

Another replicable PECI program, AirCare Plus, was also created in 2002. The program trains HVAC contractors to offer no-cost diagnostic tune-ups to utility customers’ HVAC systems. Increasing the efficiency of HVAC equipment saves energy from what is typically a home or commercial building's largest energy consumer. It also increases equipment life and reduces the building's environmental impact. AirCare Plus programs have been launched across the Pacific Northwest and California, saving more than 91 million kWh of electricity.

PECI opened two California offices in 2010, in Santa Ana and San Francisco. The same year, PECI won an $18.8 million contract from the California Energy Commission, funded by the American Recovery and Reinvestment Act of 2009 to run a program called EnergySmart Jobs. The program was similar to EnergySmart Grocer, except that energy audits were performed by PECI-trained members of the California Conservation Corp, a work development program for men and women between the ages of 18 and 25. EnergySmart Jobs operated in California from 2010 to 2012 and saved more than 62 million kWh of electricity and created 265 job years, the U.S. government's official metric to measure jobs created by ARRA funds.

In 2011, PECI moved its headquarters to a LEED Platinum Platinum building in downtown Portland. PECI added many energy-efficient features to the core building, including insulated low-e glass windows, a high-efficiency HVAC system, daylight dimming mechanisms and energy-efficient data center systems.

== Corporate social responsibility ==
According to PECI's 2013 Corporate Social Responsibility Report, PECI's Portland office consumed 527,489 kWh of electricity and created 10.3 tons of waste in 2013, equal to about 91 pounds per employee and 0.36 pounds per employee per day. According to the EPA, in 2010, the average American generated 4.43 pounds of waste per day. 39 percent of PECI's total waste was recycled (2010 U.S. recycling rate: 34.1%) and 36 percent was composted. PECI employees traveled 2.4 million miles for commuting and business travel in 2013. About 55 percent of commuting miles were travelled via bicycle and public transit, with the remainder traveled by carpool or single-occupancy vehicle.

PECI participated in volunteer, charitable, and educational activities with the Community Energy Project, Clark Center for Men, Friends of Trees, and the Northwest Earth Institute in 2013.

== Energy Savings ==
The effectiveness of energy efficiency programs is typically measured by energy savings, in the form of electricity, gas, and water consumption that was avoided as a result of program efforts. In 2012, PECI programs saved 328 million kWh of electricity, 3.6 million Therms of gas and 3.36 million gallons of water.

According to an energy savings equivalency calculator from the Environmental Protection Agency, these energy savings equal:

1. The annual greenhouse gas emissions produced by 51,963 cars
2. The monthly CO_{2} emissions of 2.79 million households
3. The CO_{2} emissions from consuming 1,073 railroad cars of coal
4. The CO_{2} emissions from consuming 21,891 tanker trucks of gasoline

== Awards ==
2013 Governor's Sustainability Award from Oregon Sustainability Board

2013 Best Green Companies to Work for in Oregon (35th)

2013 Sustainability at Work Gold Certification

2012 Portland Afoot Top 25 Best Employers for Low-Car Commuters

2012 Best Green Companies to Work for in Oregon (26th)

2012 Energy Star Partner of the Year – Utah Home Performance Program

2012 Energy Star Sustained Excellence - Questar Thermwise Builder Program

2011 Best Non-Profits to Work For in Oregon

2011 100 Best Green Companies to Work for in Oregon (22nd)

2011 City of Portland Climate Champion

2010 AESP Program Design and Implementation Award – Energy Trust of Oregon New Homes Program

2010 100 Best Green Companies to Work for in Oregon (15th)

2010 Energy Star Partner of the Year – Questar Gas

2010 Energy Star Sustained Excellence – Rocky Mountain Power

2010 Pacific Gas & Electric Integration Awards – AirCare Plus

2010 San Diego Gas & Electric Energy Champion

2009 Energy Star Partner of the Year – Rocky Mountain Power

2009 Energy Star Partner of the Year – Questar Gas

2009 100 Best Green Companies to Work for in Oregon (37th)
