= Energy conservation in the United States =

How power is used and saved by Americans

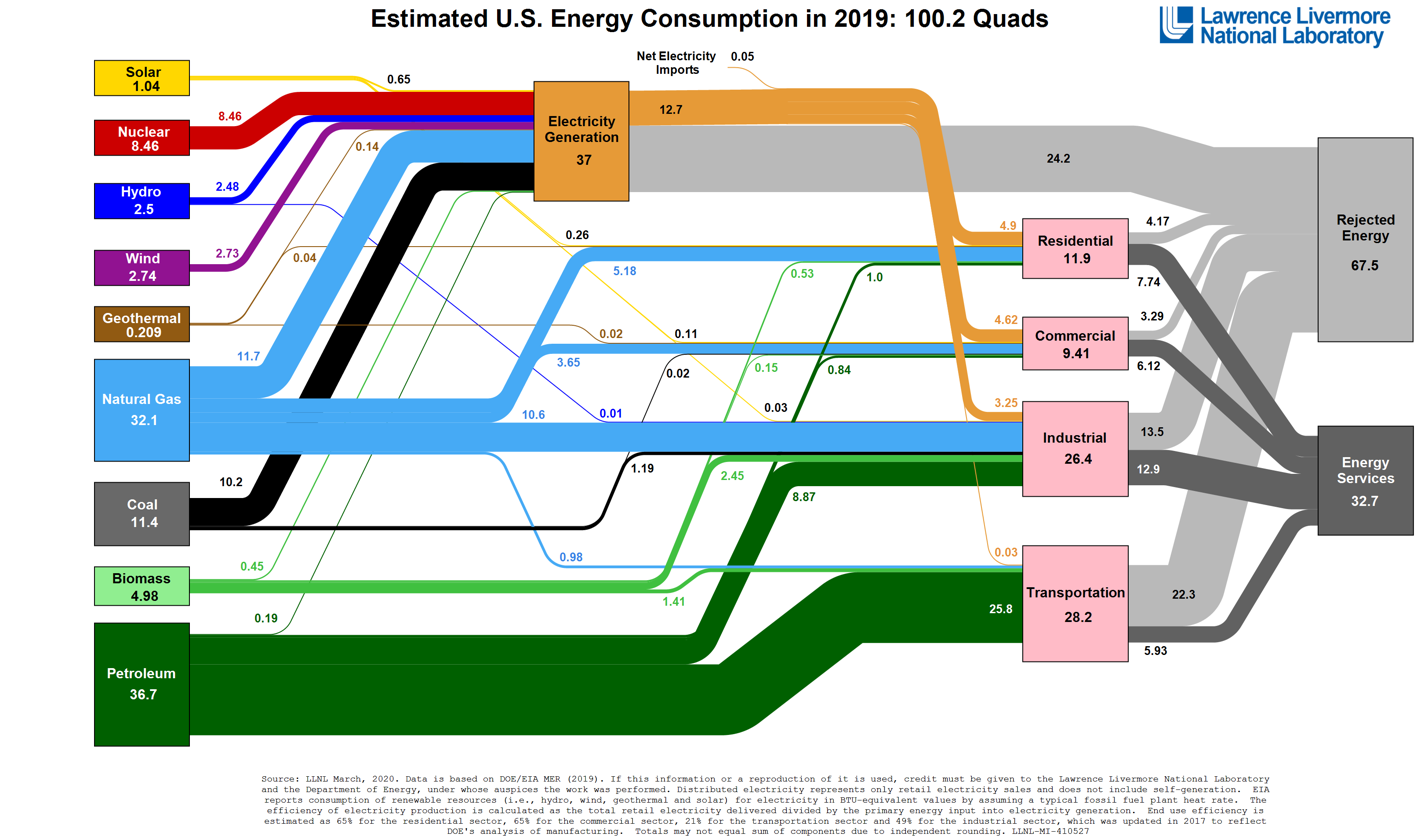
US Energy Consumption, 2019

The United States is the second-largest single consumer of energy in the world. The U.S. Department of Energy categorizes national energy use in four broad sectors: transportation, residential, commercial, and industrial. Energy usage in transportation and residential sectors (about half of U.S. energy consumption) is largely controlled by individual domestic consumers. Commercial and industrial energy expenditures are determined by businesses entities and other facility managers. National energy policy has a significant effect on energy usage across all four sectors.

== Transportation ==
The transportation sector includes all vehicles used for personal or freight transportation. Of the energy used in this sector, approximately 65% is consumed by gasoline-powered vehicles, primarily personally owned. Diesel-powered transport (trains, merchant ships, heavy trucks, etc.) consumes about 20%, and air traffic consumes most of the remaining 15%. The two oil supply crisis of the 1970s spurred the creation, in 1975, of the federal Corporate Average Fuel Economy (CAFE) program, which required auto manufacturers to meet progressively higher fleet fuel economy targets.

The 1980s saw dramatic improvements in fuel economy, mostly the result of reductions in vehicle size and weight which originated in the late 1970s, along with the transition to front wheel drive. These gains eroded somewhat after 1990 due to the growing popularity of sport utility vehicles, pickup trucks and minivans, which fall under the more lenient "light truck" CAFE standard.

In addition to the CAFE program, the U.S. government has tried to encourage better vehicle efficiency through tax policy. Since 2002, taxpayers have been eligible for income tax credits for gas/electric hybrid vehicles. A "gas-guzzler" tax has been assessed on manufacturers since 1978 for cars with exceptionally poor fuel economy. While this tax remains in effect, it generates very little revenue as overall fuel economy has improved.

Another focus in gasoline conservation is reducing the number of miles driven. An estimated 40% of American automobile use is associated with daily commuting. Many urban areas offer subsidized public transportation to reduce commuting traffic, and encourage carpooling by providing designated high-occupancy vehicle lanes and lower tolls for cars with multiple riders. Remote work is also a viable alternative to commuting for some jobs.

Fuel economy-maximizing behaviors also help reduce fuel consumption. Among the most effective are moderate driving, as opposed to aggressive driving, driving at lower speeds, using cruise control, and turning off a vehicle's engine at stops rather than idling. A vehicle's gas mileage decreases rapidly with increasing highway speeds, normally above 55 miles per hour (though the exact number varies by vehicle), because aerodynamic forces are proportionally related to the square of an object's speed (when the speed is doubled, drag quadruples). According to the U.S. Department of Energy (DOE), as a rule of thumb, each 5 mph (8.0 km/h) one drives over 60 mph (97 km/h) is similar to paying an additional $0.30 per gallon for gas. The exact speed at which a vehicle achieves its highest efficiency varies based on the vehicle's drag coefficient, frontal area, surrounding air speed, and the efficiency and gearing of a vehicle's drive train and transmission.

== Residential sector ==
The residential sector is all private residences, including single-family homes, apartments, manufactured homes and dormitories. Energy use in this sector varies significantly across the country, due to regional climate differences and different regulation. On average, about half of the energy used in U.S. homes is expended on space conditioning (i.e. heating and cooling).

The efficiency of furnaces and air conditioners has increased steadily since the energy crises of the 1970s. The 1987 National Appliance Energy Conservation Act authorized the Department of Energy to set minimum efficiency standards for space conditioning equipment and other appliances each year, based on what is "technologically feasible and economically justified". Beyond these minimum standards, the Environmental Protection Agency (EPA) awards the Energy Star designation to appliances that exceed industry efficiency averages by an EPA-specified percentage.

Despite technological improvements, many American lifestyle changes have put higher demands on heating and cooling resources. The average size of homes built in the United States has increased from 1,500 sq ft (140 m^{2}) in 1970 to 2,300 sq ft (210 m^{2}) in 2005. The single-person household has become more common, as has central air conditioning: 23% of households had central air conditioning in 1978, that figure rose to 55% by 2001.

As furnace efficiency gets higher, appropriate matching of equipment size to distribution system capacity and building load becomes more critical to optimizing equipment ability to maximize efficient operation. Installing much lower output high-efficiency replacement equipment offers opportunity for comfort and savings gains, but improving the building envelope through air sealing and adding more insulation, advanced windows, etc., should be explored concurrently or before replacement equipment design stage. The passive house approach produces superinsulated buildings that approach zero net energy consumption. Improving the building envelope can also be cheaper than replacing a furnace or air conditioner.

Even lower cost improvements include weatherization, which is frequently subsidized by utilities or state and federal tax credits, as are programmable thermostats. Consumers have also been urged to adopt a wider indoor temperature range (e.g. 65 °F (18 °C) in the winter, 80 °F (27 °C) in the summer).

One underutilized, but potentially very powerful means to reduce household energy consumption is to provide real-time feedback to homeowners so they can effectively alter their energy using behavior. Low-cost energy feedback displays, such as the Energy Detective or Wattvision, have become available. A study of a similar device deployed in 500 homes in Ontario, Canada, by Hydro One showed an average 6.5% drop in total electricity use when compared with a similarly sized control group. Another technique is to ask homeowners to conserve energy in real time at times of peak demand, when relatively dirty power plants would otherwise need to be turned on.

Standby power used by consumer electronics and appliances while they are turned off accounts for an estimated 5 to 10% of household electricity consumption, adding an estimated $3 billion to annual energy costs in the US. "In the average home, 75% of the electricity used to power home electronics is consumed while the products are turned off."

=== Home energy consumption averages ===
Home energy consumption averages
Sector	Percentage	Notes
Home heating systems	28.9%	
Home cooling systems	14.0%	
Water heating	12.9%	
Lighting	9.0%	
Home electronics	7.1%	
Refrigerators and freezers	5.9%	
Clothing and dish washers	4.5%	includes clothes dryers, does not include hot water
Cookings	3.7%	
Computers	2.2%	
Other	4.4%	includes small electrics, heating elements, motors, pool and hot tub heaters, outdoor grills, and natural gas outdoor lighting
Non end-user energy expenditure	5.4%	

Energy usage in some homes may vary widely from these averages. Milder regions such as the Southern U.S. and Pacific Coast of the US need far less energy for space conditioning than New York City or Chicago. Air conditioning energy use can be quite high in hot-arid regions (Southwest) and hot-humid zones (Southeast) In milder climates such as San Diego, lighting energy may easily consume up to 40% of total energy. Certain appliances such as a waterbed, hot tub, or pre-1990 refrigerator, use significant amounts of electricity.

Recent trends in home entertainment equipment can make a large difference in household energy use. For instance a 50-inch LCD television, average on-time of six hours a day, may draw 300 watts less than a similarly sized plasma system. In most residences no single appliance dominates, and any conservation efforts must be directed to numerous areas in order to achieve substantial energy savings. Ground, air and water source heat pump systems, solar heating systems and evaporative coolers are among the more energy efficient, environmentally clean, and cost-effective space conditioning and domestic hot water systems available (Environmental Protection Agency), and can achieve reductions in energy consumptions of up to 69%.

=== Building practices ===
Current practices in building design, construction, and retrofitting result in homes that are profoundly more energy conserving than average new homes. This includes insulation and energy-efficient windows and lighting.

Modern methods construct homes such that minimal resources are used to cooling and heating the house in summer and winter respectively can significantly reduce energy costs.

== Commercial sector ==
The commercial sector consists of retail stores, offices (business and government), restaurants, schools and other workplaces. Energy in this sector has the same basic end uses as the residential sector, in slightly different proportions. Space conditioning is again the single biggest consumption area, but it represents only about 30% of the energy use of commercial buildings. Lighting, at 25%, plays a much larger role than it does in the residential sector. Lighting is also generally the most wasteful component of commercial use. Several case studies indicate that more efficient lighting and elimination of over-illumination can reduce lighting energy by approximately fifty percent in many commercial buildings.

Commercial buildings can greatly increase energy efficiency by thoughtful design, with today's building stock being very poor examples of the potential of systematic (not expensive) energy efficient design. Commercial buildings often have professional management, allowing centralized control and coordination of energy conservation efforts. As a result, fluorescent lighting (about four times as efficient as incandescent) is the standard for most commercial space, although it may produce certain adverse health effects.

Potential health concerns can be mitigated by using newer fixtures with electronic ballasts rather than older magnetic ballasts. As most buildings have consistent hours of operation, programmed thermostats and lighting controls are common. However, too many companies believe that merely having a computer controlled Building automation system guarantees energy efficiency. As an example one large company in Northern California boasted that it was confident its state of the art system had optimized space heating. A more careful analysis by Lumina Technologies showed the system had been given programming instructions to maintain constant 24‑hour temperatures in the entire building complex. This instruction caused the injection of nighttime heat into vacant buildings when the daytime summer temperatures would often exceed 90 °F (32 °C). This mis-programming was costing the company over $130,000 per year in wasted energy (Lumina Technologies, 1997). Many corporations and governments also require the Energy Star rating for any new equipment purchased for their buildings.

Solar heat loading through standard window designs usually leads to high demand for air conditioning in summer months. An example of building design overcoming this excessive heat loading is the Dakin Building in Brisbane, California, where fenestration was designed to achieve an angle with respect to sun incidence to allow maximum reflection of solar heat; this design also assisted in reducing interior over-illumination to enhance worker efficiency and comfort.

Advances include use of occupancy sensors to turn off lights when spaces are unoccupied, and photosensors to dim or turn off electric lighting when natural light is available. In air conditioning systems, overall equipment efficiencies have increased as energy codes and consumer information have begun to emphasise year-round performance rather than just efficiency ratings at maximum output. Controllers that automatically vary the speeds of fans, pumps, and compressors have radically improved part-load performance of those devices.

For space or water heating, electric heat pumps consume roughly half the energy required by electric resistance heaters. Natural gas heating efficiencies have improved through use of condensing furnaces and boilers, in which the water vapor in the flue gas is cooled to liquid form before it is discharged, allowing the heat of condensation to be used. In buildings where high levels of outside air are required, heat exchangers can capture heat from the exhaust air to preheat incoming supply air.

A company in Florida tackled the issue of both energy-conservation and enhancing its workplace environment by implementing a conveyor system that is 40–60% quieter than traditional systems, emitting a noise level of only 55-50 decibels, equivalent to a soft-rock radio station. Lighting was addressed by not only programming the lighting console so that isolated lights could be switched on and off in designated areas of the warehouse, but also by enhancing natural lighting through the use of skylights and a high-gloss floor.

== Industrial sector ==
The industrial sector represents all production and processing of goods, including manufacturing, construction, farming, water management and mining.

Increasing costs have forced energy-intensive industries to make substantial efficiency improvements in the past 30 years. For example, the energy used to produce steel and paper products has been cut 40% in that time frame, while petroleum/aluminum refining and cement production have reduced their usage by about 25%. These reductions are largely the result of recycling waste material and the use of cogeneration equipment for electricity and heating.

Another example for efficiency improvements is the use of products made of high temperature insulation wool (HTIW) which enables predominantly industrial users to operate thermal treatment plants at temperatures between 800 and 1400 °C. In these high-temperature applications, the consumption of primary energy and the associated CO_{2} emissions can be reduced by up to 50% compared with old-fashioned industrial installations.

U.S. agriculture has doubled farm energy efficiency in the last 25 years.

The energy required for delivery and treatment of fresh water often constitutes a significant percentage of a region's electricity and natural gas usage (an estimated 20% of California's total energy use is water-related). In light of this, some local governments have worked toward a more integrated approach to energy and water conservation efforts.

To conserve energy, some industries have begun using solar panels to heat their water.

Unlike the other sectors, total energy use in the industrial sector has declined in the last decade. While this is partly due to conservation efforts, it is also a reflection of the growing trend for U.S. companies to move manufacturing operations overseas.. This may also be due to the adoption of new technologies, such as improvements in tool geometry, that increase manufacturing efficiency. An increase in efficiency lowers energy usage by reducing idle time and resource wastage.

== Government incentives and initiatives ==
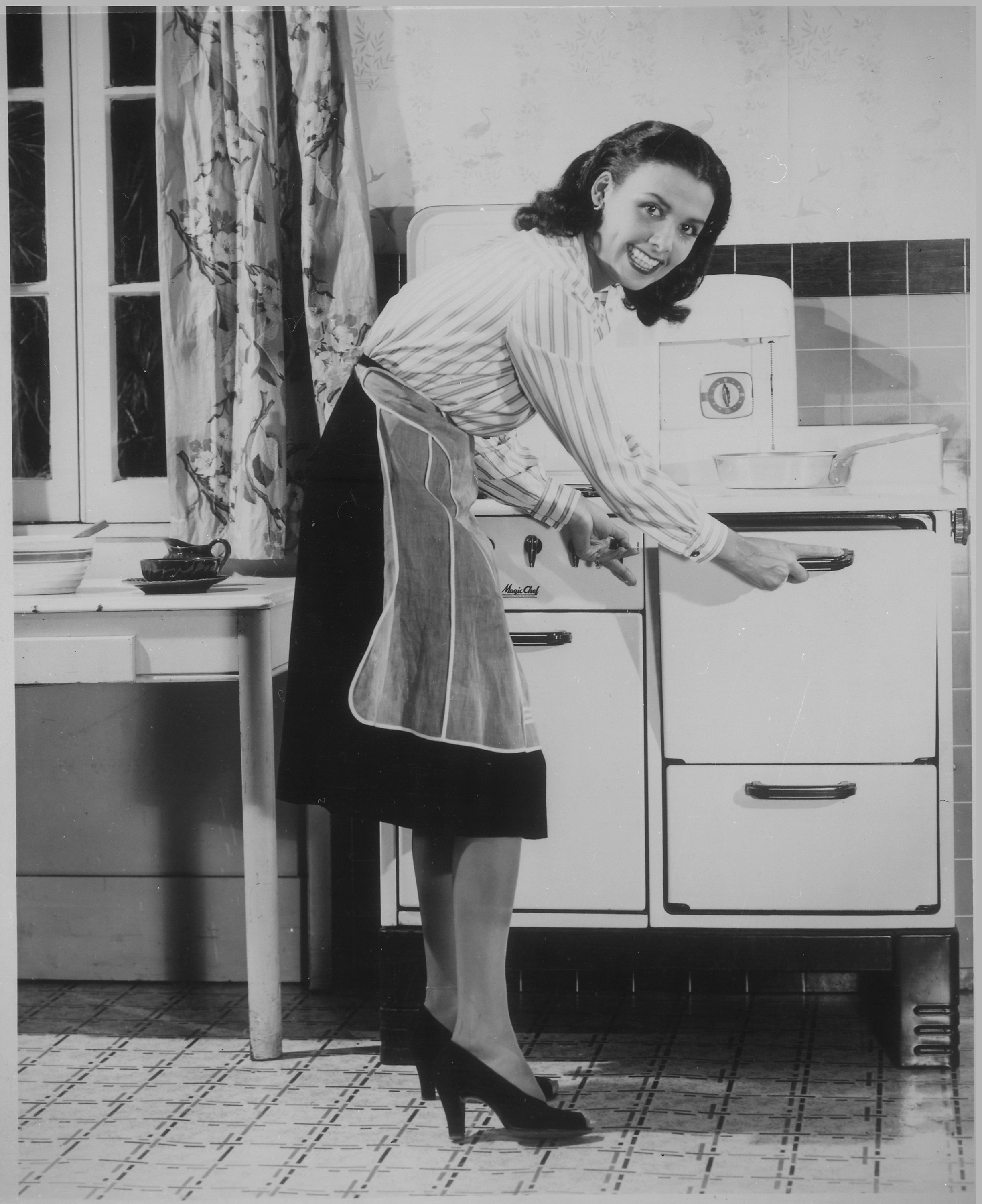
Wartime propaganda for conservation at home

Part B of Title III of the Energy Policy and Conservation Act established the Energy Conservation Program for Consumer Products other than Automobiles, which gives the Department of Energy the "authority to develop, revise, and implement minimum energy conservation standards for appliances and equipment." As currently implemented, the Department of Energy enforces test procedures and minimum standards for more than 50 products covering residential, commercial and industrial, lighting, and plumbing applications.

The Energy Policy Act of 2005 included incentives which provided a tax credit of 30% of the cost of the new item with a $500 aggregate limit; the program was initially set to expire at the end of 2007 but was extended to 2010 and the aggregate limit increased to $1,500 by the Energy Improvement and Extension Act of 2008 and The American Recovery and Reinvestment Act of 2009, when it will expire.

The states and local areas (e.g., cities or counties) have various initiatives, and the U.S. Department of Energy has funded a database known as DSIRE which provides information on these initiatives. The state of Maryland set a target of reducing its electricity usage by 15% from 2008 to 2015.

By Executive Order 13514, U.S. President Barack Obama mandated that by 2015, 15% of existing Federal buildings conform to new energy efficiency standards and 100% of all new Federal buildings be zero-net-energy by 2030.

In February 2023 the United States Department of Energy proposed a set of new energy efficiency standards that, if implemented, will save to users of different electric machines in the United States around 3,500,000,000$ per year and will reduce by the year 2050 carbon emissions by the same amount as emitted by 29,000,000 houses.

== See also ==
- Earthship
- Environment of the United States
- Focus on Energy, Wisconsin
- Passive house
- Portland Energy Conservation
- Superinsulation
- Self-sufficient homes
- Zero energy building
- Zero-Net-Energy USA Federal Buildings

General:

- Energy and the environment
- Efficient energy use
