= Ecochallenge.org =

Nonprofit organization in Portland, Oregon

- Formation: 1993
- Founder: Jeanne Roy and Dick Roy
- Type: Nonprofit
- Purpose: environmental, educational
- Headquarters: Portland, Oregon, US
- Region served: Worldwide
- Key people: Mike Mercer (Executive Director)
- Website: https://ecochallenge.org/
- Formerly called: Northwest Earth Institute

Ecochallenge.org (formerly Northwest Earth Institute or NWEI) is a nonprofit organization based in Portland, Oregon. It develops and implements programs designed to motivate individuals and organizations to take action toward a sustainable future. Their most successful program is a series of ten self-facilitated discussion courses to be used by small groups that address various topics related to the environment and sustainable living.

== History ==
Ecochallenge.org was founded in 1993 as Northwest Earth Institute by Dick and Jeanne Roy with $45,000 in start-up grants and thirteen volunteers with the goal of "taking earth-centered programs into mainstream workplaces." Prior to Northwest Earth Institute, Dick had worked as a corporate lawyer since 1970 and Jeanne as an activist on air quality and solid waste issues. In 1993, Dick resigned from his job as a lawyer to volunteer full-time with Jeanne.

Deep Ecology was the first implemented program and included a discussion course and manual on the topic of deep ecology. The institute also started offering a Home Eco-Party Program and the Oregon High School Earth Club Program. The organization discontinued the Earth Club Program due to a lack of funding.

== Ecochallenge ==
Every October, the organization challenges people across the world to choose one action to reduce their environmental impact and stick with it for two weeks. Individuals and teams choose a category — water, trash, energy, food, or transportation.

In 2009, it held its inaugural Ecochallenge, and the event has grown since then. The Ecochallenge is open to people from around the world. The Ecochallenge has garnered recent attention, most notably in higher education, as university professors have increasingly incorporated the event into their curricula, and corporations have involved hundreds of their employees.
