= Peći, Bosansko Grahovo =

Peći Пећи
- Village
- Location within Bosnia and Herzegovina
- Coordinates: 44°14′13″N 16°19′01″E
- Country: Bosnia and Herzegovina
- Entity: Federation of Bosnia and Herzegovina
- Canton: Canton 10
- Municipality: Bosansko Grahovo

Area
  - Total: 21.47 km^{2} (8.29 sq mi)

Population (2013)
  - Total: 203
  - Density: 9.46/km^{2} (24.5/sq mi)
- Time zone: UTC+1 (CET)
  - Summer (DST): UTC+2 (CEST)

Peći (Serbian Cyrillic: Пећи) is a village in the Municipality of Bosansko Grahovo in Canton 10 of the Federation of Bosnia and Herzegovina, an entity of Bosnia and Herzegovina.

== Demographics ==
According to the 2013 census, its population was 203.

Ethnicity in 2013
| Ethnicity | Number | Percentage |
|---|---|---|
| Serbs | 201 | 99.0% |
| Croats | 1 | 0.5% |
| other/undeclared | 1 | 0.5% |
| Total | 203 | 100% |

== Bibliography ==
- Ethnicity/National Affiliation, Religion and Mother Tongue (PDF). Sarajevo: Agency for Statistics of Bosnia and Herzegovina. 2019.
