= Focus on Energy =

Statewide Program in Wisconsin

Focus on Energy is a statewide program in Wisconsin that offers information and services to help residents and businesses select and install cost-effective solutions that save energy and money.

== Overview ==
Focus on Energy was formed in 2001 as Wisconsin's statewide energy efficiency and renewable resource initiative. The program's goals are to work with eligible Wisconsin residents and businesses to help them manage rising energy costs, promote in-state economic development, protect the environment and control the state's growing demand for electricity and natural gas.

Through 2008, Focus on Energy has helped Wisconsin residents and businesses save $239 million and 1,729,990,576 kilowatt hours.

== History ==
Focus was originally formed by the Wisconsin Legislature in 1999 and funded by the Utility Public Benefits fund. In 2001, the Department of Administration rolled out the Focus on Energy Program statewide, in partnership with consumers, utilities, businesses, nonprofit organizations and governmental agencies. Per the legislation, Focus aims to:

- Reduce the amount of energy used per unit of production in Wisconsin, while improving energy reliability.
- Enhance economic development and make Wisconsin firms more competitive.
- Reduce the environmental impacts of energy use.
- Expand the ability of markets to deliver energy efficient and renewable energy goods and services to consumers and businesses.
- Deliver quantified financial returns on public investments in energy improvements.

Under 2005 Wisconsin Act 141, investor-owned electric and natural-gas utilities are required to spend 1.2 percent of their annual gross operating revenues on energy efficiency programs and renewable resource programs. The Act requires municipal and electric cooperative utilities that choose not to conduct their own programs to contribute revenue to the statewide program (Focus on Energy) created and funded by investor-owned utilities. Municipal and electric cooperative utilities can elect to operate their own Commitment to Community programs.
