= Energy Trust of Oregon =

Energy Trust of Oregon is an independent nonprofit organization created by the State of Oregon to help residences and businesses reduce energy consumption. It is funded by customers of investor owned utility companies. It offers services and cash incentives to customers of Portland General Electric, Pacific Power, NW Natural, Cascade Natural Gas, and Avista in Oregon. It also serves customers of NW Natural in Washington.

== History ==
In 1999, the Oregon Legislature passed an electric industry restructuring law, SB 1149, aimed at establishing a stable funding source for residential, commercial, and industrial electric efficiency, renewable energy, and market transformation programs. This legislation mandates the state’s largest investor-owned electric utilities to collect a 3% public purpose charge and authorizes the Oregon Public Utility Commission(OPUC) to allocate a portion of these funds to an independent non-governmental entity.

Energy Trust of Oregon was established in 2002.

== Funding ==
Energy Trust is funded by customers of Portland General Electric, Pacific Power, NW Natural, Cascade Natural Gas and Avista. Customers of these five utilities pay a dedicated percentage of their utility bills to support a variety of energy efficiency and renewable energy services and programs.

== Programs ==
In general, Energy Trust operates its programs through contracts with service providers. A volunteer, non-stakeholder board of directors oversees the organization.

Energy Trust offers cash incentives for a variety of energy-efficiency improvements and renewable energy systems for homes, businesses, industrial facilities, agricultural operations and public and nonprofit buildings.
