= Environmental policy of the Biden administration =

US federal executive's anti-pollution measures

The environmental policy of the Joe Biden administration includes a series of laws, regulations, and programs introduced by United States President Joe Biden from 2021 to 2025. Many of the actions taken by the Biden administration reversed or attempted to reverse the first-term policies of his predecessor, Donald Trump.

Biden's climate change policy focused on reducing greenhouse gas emissions, similar to the efforts taken by the Obama administration. Biden also promised to end and reverse deforestation and land degradation by 2030. The main climate target of the Biden administration was to reduce greenhouse gas emissions by the United States to net zero by 2050. A climate team was created to lead the effort.

On his first day in office, Biden began to make policy changes to protect the environment. He began by revising and strengthening the National Environmental Policy Act (NEPA) and ordering several executive orders aimed at reviewing or undoing the environmental policies of the former administration; these policies included removal of some wildlife protections, the construction of the Keystone XL pipeline, and drilling for oil and gas on federal lands. In the same day, Biden had the United States rejoin the Paris Agreement. Biden has also supported climate justice and sustainable transportation.

Additionally, the Biden administration delivered a tax plan to Congress aiming to replace fossil fuel subsidies, with incentives for green energy. Its proposed budget includes a 30% increase in funding for clean energy, including in rural communities. Biden has also ordered the amount of energy produced from offshore wind turbines to be doubled by 2030. In April 2021, Biden hosted a virtual climate summit with 40 world leaders. In November 2021, he advanced measures to reduce global warming with other world leaders at the 2021 United Nations Climate Change Conference (COP26). After four years of absence under the former president, the U.S. sought to regain its credibility. In November 2021, Biden signed the Infrastructure Investment and Jobs Act, a major pillar of his environmental policy. By July 2022, the Biden administration had created a total of 54 environmental policies and proposed 43 more.

In August 2022, Biden signed into law the Inflation Reduction Act of 2022, which includes the largest federal climate change investment in American history. The act has the capacity to create $3 trillion in climate investments in the 2022–2032 period and $11 trillion in overall infrastructure investments by 2050. According to some estimates, with the Inflation Reduction Act and other federal and state measures, the United States can reach its pledge in the Paris Agreement of 50%–52% greenhouse gas emissions reductions from 2005 by the year 2030.

Some environmental organizations, including Sierra Club, Sunrise Movement, Earthjustice, and more, claim that President Biden took 322 actions to protect the environment—more than any other president in history.

== Domestic policy ==
In May 2022, the White House Council on Environmental Quality released a report describing how Biden's administration followed around 200 recommendations of the White House Environmental Justice Advisory Council. The full report has around 150 pages; it summarizes many of the steps taken by the administration in the environmental domain. Among others, it mentions:

- Unprecedented funding for energy efficiency implementation and weatherization
- Promoting transit-oriented development, walkability, cycling, and mixed-use development
- Promoting cooperation with Indigenous peoples of the Americas in environmental issues

=== Climate team personnel as of 2024 ===
As of 2024, the following officials composed Joe Biden's team for advancing his policy on climate change:

Name	Office	Background
Gina McCarthy	National Climate Advisor (January 2021–September 2022)	EPA administrator, environmental advisor to five governors
Ali Zaidi	National Climate Advisor (September 2022–January 2025)	Office of Management and Budget official, a lawyer focused on sustainability and climate change
John Kerry	Special Envoy for Climate Change (January 2021–March 2024)	Secretary of State, helped to create the Paris Agreement and signed it as a representative of the United States
John Podesta	Senior Advisor for International Climate Policy (successor to the Special Envoy)	Former White House Chief of Staff to Bill Clinton, coordinated climate policy under President Obama
Jennifer Granholm	Energy Secretary	Michigan governor, advocated the use of renewable energy, electric vehicles and job creation
Deb Haaland	Interior Secretary	Member of Congress, co-sponsor of the Green New Deal
Michael Regan	Environmental Protection Agency Administrator	Secretary of North Carolina Department of Environmental Quality, environmental regulator
Brenda Mallory	Director of Council on Environmental Quality	General Counsel of the Environmental Protection Agency, environmental lawyer
Tom Vilsack	Agriculture Secretary	Also was Secretary of Agriculture under President Obama

=== Climate change mitigation policies ===
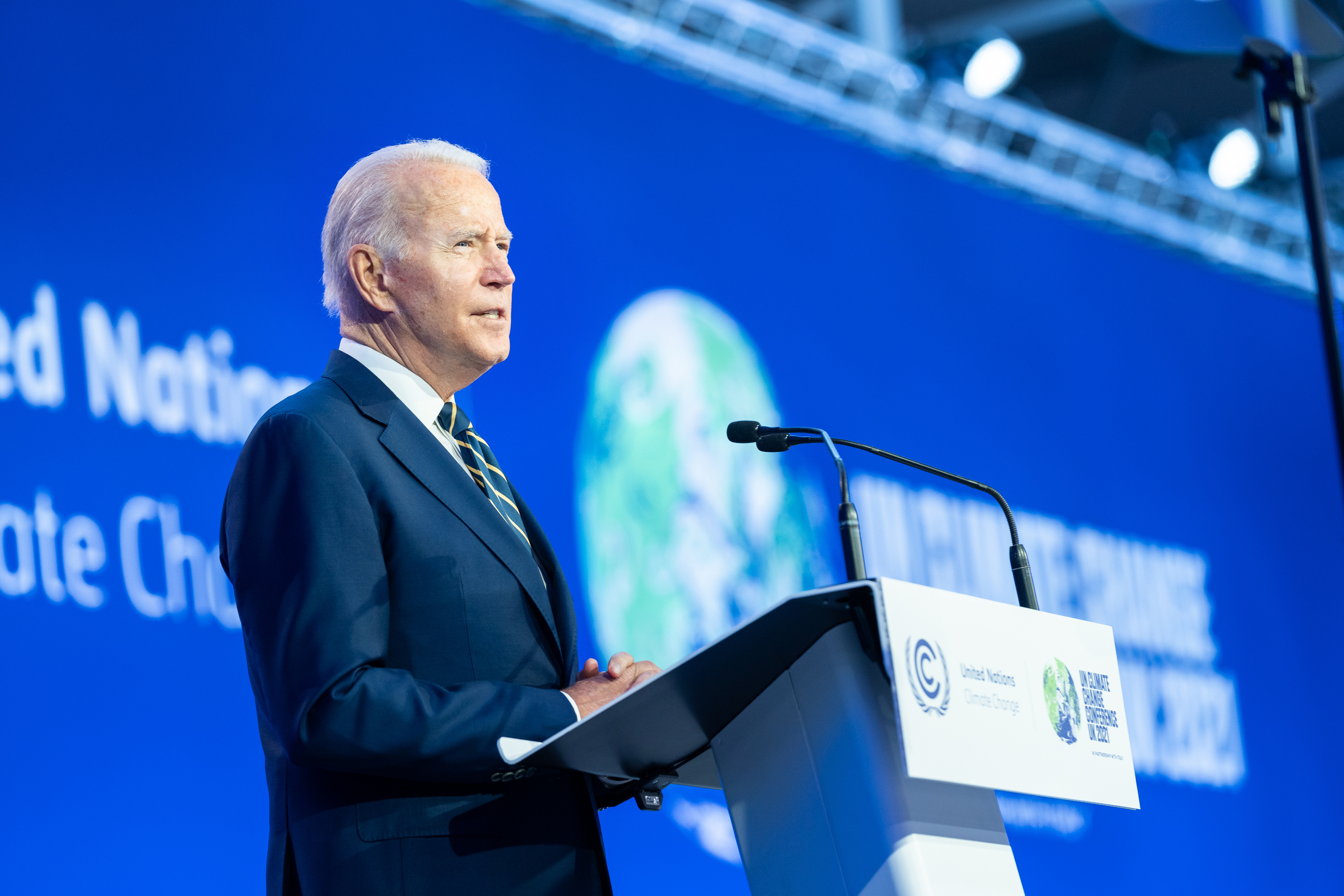
Biden at the opening ceremony of the COP26 climate summit in Glasgow, Scotland on November 1, 2021

The administration's final target is reaching carbon neutrality in the United States by 2050. Biden sees climate change as an "existential threat", a view supported by most in the scientific community. During his inauguration, Biden said that "A cry for survival comes from the planet itself, a cry that can't be any more desperate or any more clear." However, some activists have criticized the administration's policies for being insufficient to prevent catastrophic climate change.

Biden's climate plan changed significantly in 2020. In the beginning, it was criticized by many environmental groups as not being aggressive enough or even being detrimental contrary to prior stances on climate. Biden consulted with them, mainly through the Biden-Sanders Unity Task Forces, and included many of their recommendations in his plans, after which it received more support.

In 2021, the administration set a target of achieving zero emissions from the power sector by 2035. (Other sectors with considerable emissions are agriculture and construction.) Biden's climate plan includes a strong increase in green building; according to the plan, four million buildings in the United States should be upgraded, as well as 2 million weatherized in the next four years. This was expected to create one million green jobs, while the entire climate plan was expected to create 10 million green jobs. This number is smaller than other proposals like the Green New Deal, however, which claims to guarantee a job for every American.

Biden ordered the Director of National Intelligence (DNI) Avril Haines to prepare a report about the impacts of climate change. Biden also included John Kerry, the Climate Envoy, in the National Security Council. He then created the National Climate Task Force and the White House Office of Domestic Climate Policy. He said: "In my view, we've already waited too long to deal with this climate crisis and we can't wait any longer. We see it with our own eyes, we feel it, we know it in our bones." and "it's time to act". He also mentioned that climate action is linked with other aspects of his agenda such as health, jobs, and security.

As of August 2021, some calculations supposed that the infrastructure bill, the budget reconciliation bill, if passed, will cut emissions by 45% by 2030. Administrative orders from Biden and some states were expected to increase the reduction to 50%. In September of that year, the EPA planned to issue its final rule to reduce hydrofluorocarbon (HFC) emissions by 85% within 15 years. (HFCs are greenhouse gases that are thousands of times more potent than CO_{2}.) In December, Biden signed an executive order directing the US government to cut its own emission by 65% by 2030 with different measures including energy efficiency, electric vehicles and renewable energy.

=== Social cost of carbon ===
On the first day of his presidency, Biden signed an order directing a return to the Obama-era policy of taking into account the social cost of carbon when implementing new regulations, a practice that the Trump administration had abandoned in 2017.

In February 2021, Biden raised the social cost of carbon in the US to $51 per tonne, replacing the lower Trump Administration's estimates with the prior estimates developed under Obama. This figure had an impact on EPA regulations but not on fuel prices. Carbon pricing was also already in operation in a few U.S. states. The $51 estimate was lower than the European Union's carbon price but higher than the Chinese carbon price. Additionally, the administration set the social cost of methane at $1,500 per tonne.

In March 2022, the court allowed the Biden administration to use the social cost of carbon, thus reversing a previous court ruling.

=== Climate legislation ===
In the years 2021–2022, Biden promoted two bills that could reduce U.S. greenhouse gas emissions by more than 50% from the level of 2005: the Infrastructure Investment and Jobs Act and the Build Back Better Act. The Build Back Better Act faced strong opposition in the Senate and was not approved. However, the Infrastructure Investment and Jobs Act was approved by Congress and signed by Biden into law in November 2021. A group of experts at the REPEAT Project said that the Infrastructure Investment and Jobs Act alone could make only a small reduction in emissions, but they didn't count the impact of measures regarding highways and public transport. Ultimately, the bill included the largest federal investment in public transit in history. It also included spending of $105 billion in public transportation while giving $110 billion to fixing roads and bridges, including measures for climate change mitigation, such as access for cyclists and pedestrians.

In August 2022, President Biden signed into law the Inflation Reduction Act, the largest climate investment by the U.S. federal government in history, which included over $391 billion to reduce carbon emissions. The bill, passing by a 51–50 vote in the Senate, explicitly defined carbon dioxide as an air pollutant under the Clean Air Act to make the Act's EPA enforcement provisions harder to challenge in court. With this law, and additional federal and state measures, the U.S. could start to fulfill its pledge in the Paris Agreement: 50% greenhouse gas emissions reduction by the year 2030.

In 2024, the administration issued new rules which could reduce emissions by over 1 billion tonnes. Among others, coal plants for operating after 2039 must use carbon capture and storage technology.

==== Infrastructure Investment and Jobs Act ====
Biden's infrastructure plan was a major pillar in his climate policy. In the beginning, Biden intended to include all his climate and infrastructure policies in one bill, including $3 trillion investments, with a large influence specifically on the greenhouse gas emissions of the United States. The plan, according to Biden's administration, was intended to help rebuild the American economy and create millions of jobs; the Biden administration often claimed that economic and climate issues are linked.

In June 2021, Biden and a group of Democratic and Republican senators agreed on a compromise: a $973 billion bill. According to an official press release, "The Plan is the largest federal investment in public transit in history and is the largest federal investment in passenger rail since the creation of Amtrak." According to the document, the plan would lower greenhouse gas emissions. On August 10, the bill was approved by the Senate. 19 Republican senators, including Mitch McConnell, voted for it, despite criticism from Donald Trump who called it "the beginning of the Green New Deal". The bill included spending $105 billion for public transit, $21 billion for environmental projects, $50 billion for water storage, $15 billion for electric vehicles, and a new entity called the Advanced Research Projects Agency–Infrastructure. $73 billion was allotted to spend on power grid infrastructure and its adjustment to renewable energy, and $110 billion was allotted to spend on fixing roads and bridges. There were also measures for climate change mitigation such as access for cyclists and pedestrians. The plan additionally included $1 billion for better connection of neighborhoods separated by transportation infrastructure. According to Biden's administration, the plan was forecasted to add 2 million jobs per year.

In November 2021, Biden signed the Infrastructure Investment and Jobs Act, which included approximately $555 billion in new investments. The bill was a major pillar of Biden's environmental policy; according to its guidebook issued in 2022, it included over 350 programs, many of which were included in the chapter of "Climate, Energy and the Environment" (pages 149–382), while many others, also related to the environment, were included in all other chapters except "Broadband" (for example, in pages 18, 40, 61, 83, 91, 103, 414, 421, 439, 443 and many more). Altogether, the programs promoted a litany of issues such as energy conservation, public transport, reforestation, recycling, protection from wildfires, and more.

==== Build Back Better Act ====
A potential $23 billion worth of tax credits for nuclear generating plants were included in the proposed bill, while the Infrastructure Investment and Jobs Act, which eventually became law, included modest amounts to support older plants and the DOE's Advanced Reactor Demonstration Program (ADRP).

==== Inflation Reduction Act ====
The Inflation Reduction Act has been considered the most important climate legislation in the history of the United States; it has been expected to make some impact internationally, possibly repositioning the country as a climate leader. It represents the largest investment into addressing climate change in American history, including more than $391 billion to reduce carbon emissions. According to several independent analyses, the law is projected to reduce 2030 U.S. greenhouse gas emissions to 40% below 2005 levels.

The bill aimed to decrease residential energy costs by focusing on improvements to home energy efficiency. Measures included $9 billion in home energy rebate programs that focused on improving access to energy efficient technologies, as well as 10 years of consumer tax credits for the use of heat pumps, rooftop solar, and high-efficiency electric heating, ventilation, air conditioning, and water heating. The bill also extended the $7,500 tax credit for the purchase of new electric vehicles while also providing a $4,000 tax credit toward the purchase of used electric vehicles in an effort to increase low- and middle-income access to such technology. Such measures were projected to lead to an average of $500 in savings on energy spending for every family receiving the maximal benefit of these incentives.

Additionally, the bill included a 30% tax credit ($1,200 to $2,000 per year) and different types of rebates (reaching $14,000) for homeowners who increased the energy efficiency of their house. In some cases, all upgrade expenses would be returned.

The bill also allocated $3 billion for helping disadvantaged communities with transportation matters, including reconnecting communities separated by transport infrastructure, assuring safe and affordable transportation, "and community engagement activities." The bill also amended improvements to clean transit. Projects improving connectivity and walkability in neighborhoods became eligible for grants between 80% and 100% of their overall cost. The bill also supported biking.

There were also funds allocated to national clean energy production, such as the continuation of the production tax credit ($30 billion) and the investment tax credit ($10 billion) toward clean energy manufacturing including solar power, wind power, and energy storage. Nonprofit entities, state and local governments, and electric cooperatives were allotted more stable and secure funding for such projects than previously, without having to seek institutional investors for help.

The bill also provided funds toward the decarbonization of the economy in other areas, as well as providing various tax credits and grants toward decarbonizing the industrial and transportation sectors. This also included a program to reduce methane emissions from production and transportation of natural gas. Additionally, the bill established a focus on communities and environmental justice by providing several grants targeting historically marginalized and disadvantaged communities disproportionally impacted by environmental pollution and climate change. The bill also allocated funds for rural communities and forestland, including $20 billion to invest in climate-smart agriculture, $5 billion in forest conservation and urban tree planting, and $2.6 billion to protect and restore coastal habitats.

The law was predicted to slash global greenhouse gas emissions in a manner similar to "eliminating the annual planet-warming pollution of France and Germany combined" and was seen as a helpful measure in limiting the warming of the planet by 1.5 °C—the target of the Paris Agreement. An assessment by the Rhodium Group, an independent research firm, estimated it would reduce national greenhouse gas emissions 32% to 42% below 2005 levels by 2030, compared to 24% to 35% under current policy, while reducing household energy costs and improving energy security. Furthermore, the Rhodium Group projected that the nuclear provisions in the bill were likely to "keep much, if not all" of the nation's nuclear reactors at risk of retiring, estimated to be 22% to 38% of the fleet, online through the 2030s.

Meanwhile, a preliminary analysis by the REPEAT Project of Princeton University estimated that the investments made by the law would reduce net emissions 42% below 2005 levels, compared to 27% under current policies (including the Bipartisan Infrastructure Law).

The nonpartisan Energy Innovation Group estimated the reduction of greenhouse gas emissions to be 37% to 41% below 2005 levels in 2030—compared to 24% without the bill. This estimate of the greenhouse gas emission reduction lined up with the figure provided by the bill's authors: a 40% reduction in carbon emissions relative to 2005 levels.

Modeling from the nonpartisan research institution Resources for the Future indicated that the bill would decrease retail power costs by 5.2% to 6.7% over a 10-year period, resulting in savings of $170 to $220 per year for the average U.S. household. They also claimed that the bill would tend to stabilize electricity prices.

In reaction to the Supreme Court case West Virginia v. EPA, which limited the EPA's authority to institute a program such as the Obama-era Clean Power Plan, Title VI of the IRA amended the Clean Air Act to explicitly designate carbon dioxide, hydrofluorocarbons, methane, nitrous oxide, perfluorocarbons, and sulfur hexafluoride as air pollutants to unambiguously provide the EPA congressional authorization to regulate carbon dioxide and other greenhouse gases, as well as to promote renewable energy.

In April 2023, Goldman Sachs estimated that the bill would create $3 trillion of climate investments from 2022–2032, with $1.2 trillion of it coming from government incentives. It also estimated the amounts that different sectors would receive, ultimately finding that heat pumps and other full home electrification technologies, plus electric power transmission, would get sizable amounts. The bill has been expected to generate $11 trillion in overall infrastructure investments by 2050.

=== Adaptation to climate change ===
Biden's administration spent a lot of effort on flood management and increasing climate resilience as a whole, especially in communities that have faced discrimination. In June 2023, $575 million was allocated to help coastal and Great Lakes communities, including tribal communities, to adapt to climate change. When Biden announced the allocation, he mentioned one of the nature reserves of California, saying: "These wetlands act as a critical buffer between the rising tides and the communities at risk." Other measures included protecting coastal ecosystems that then protected communities from sea level rise, storm surge, and more.

In 2023, an agreement between seven states was achieved, aiming to preserve the Colorado River water system from collapse due to poor management and climate change; the country is heavily dependent on this river. Meanwhile, some states would reduce water use, receiving compensation for it ($1.2 billion), from the federal government. Many other projects for preserving the river, such as water recycling and rainwater harvesting, were also advanced. Funding came from the IIJA and IRA.

=== American Climate Corps ===
Biden created the American Climate Corps, a national service of the U.S. government focused on climate change prevention. The program was launched in September 2023. Its tasks have not been defined precisely, but "things like installing solar panels, restoring vulnerable habitats, and fire hazard prevention" were mentioned. According to Biden's plan, in the American Climate Corps' first year, the number of participants was supposed to rise to 20,000; 50,000 more was expected to be added each year by 2031. Such plan has been strongly opposed by Republicans.

On Earth Day 2024, in the Prince William Forest Park created by the Civilian Conservation Corps, Biden officially launched the Corps' website, on which people could apply for available jobs. 2,000 jobs had already been available when the declaration was made; more than 42,000 people expressed interest in participating.

=== Climate-related financial and green marketing regulation ===
As part of the administration's long-term strategy to cut U.S. greenhouse gas emissions in half by 2030, Biden issued Executive Order 14030 in May 2021. It directed U.S. Secretary of the Treasury Janet Yellen, as head of the Financial Stability Oversight Council (FSOC), to work with FSOC members to prepare a report on member agency initiatives which included climate-related financial risk in their policies and programs, including policy actions to enhance disclosures by regulated entities to mitigate risk to the U.S. financial system from climate change.

In October 2021, FSOC released a report which identified climate change as an emerging and increasing threat to the stability of the U.S. financial system. In August 2022, Section 60111 in Title VI of the Inflation Reduction Act appropriated $5 million to the Greenhouse Gas Reporting Program (GHGRP) of the U.S. Environmental Protection Agency (EPA), created under the Clean Air Act in 2009, to support enhanced standardization and transparency of corporate greenhouse gas emission reduction commitment plans and interim targets. It also supported corporations' progress towards implementing such plans and meeting such commitments.

In May 2024, Yellen, U.S. Secretary of Agriculture Tom Vilsack, U.S. Secretary of Energy Jennifer Granholm, U.S. Special Presidential Envoy for Climate John Podesta, National Economic Council Director Lael Brainard, and National Climate Advisor Ali Zaidi issued a joint policy statement providing non-binding guidance to voluntary carbon markets.

==== CFTC and Agriculture Department ====
In March 2021, Acting Commodity Futures Trading Commission (CFTC) Chair Rostin Behnam announced the formation of an agency interdivisional unit to assess the impact of climate risks on futures, options, and other derivatives markets. In June 2022, the CFTC issued a request for information (RFI) to solicit public comment until October 7, 2022 to inform the agency's response to the recommendations made in the October 2021 FSOC report on climate-related financial risk. It also hosted a convening for voluntary carbon market participants to discuss improving the credibility of carbon credits. In April 2023, in remarks made at an event hosted by the Bipartisan Policy Center, Behnam stated that the CFTC had the clear legal authority to oversee the carbon credits market to prevent securities fraud and market manipulation (as carbon credits are financial derivatives of an underlying commodity) but not to establish standards for carbon credit registries. He also stated that the CFTC was considering hosting a second convening for voluntary carbon market participants later in the year before formulating an agency policy on carbon credits.

In June 2023, the CFTC announced that it would host a second convening the following month. The CFTC Whistleblower Office also announced that it was seeking tips for violations of the Commodity Exchange Act in carbon credit markets. In December 2023, the CFTC released a rule proposal for carbon credit derivative exchange listing that would require commodities exchanges (that trade carbon credit derivatives) to verify the quality of their underlying carbon offsets. CFTC Commissioner Christy Goldsmith Romero stated in May 2024 that the agency expected the rule to be finalized by the end of the year and possibly as early as the following September.

In December 2022, Title I of Division HH of the Consolidated Appropriations Act, 2023 enacted the Growing Climate Solutions Act. It required the U.S. Department of Agriculture to evaluate and make a determination of whether to create a Greenhouse Gas Technical Assistance Provider and Third-Party Verifier Program that would then create a voluntary registry for private businesses, nonprofit organizations, or public agencies that acted as third-party verifiers of carbon credits for agricultural or forestry carbon offset projects. This would include standardized registration qualifications for participating entities and standardized protocols for ensuring the transparency of carbon credits verified by the registered entities in the program.

In October 2023, the Department of Agriculture released an assessment report pursuant to the Growing Climate Solutions Act to provide an overview of the agriculture and forestry carbon credits market. It concluded that there were barriers to participation in the market by U.S. farmers, ranchers, and foresters (e.g. limited return on investment due to high upfront and transaction costs, greenhouse gas data quantification, collection, verification, and reporting, permanent carbon sequestration requirements, and market confusion over carbon market programs due to inconsistent standards). The report then stated that such barriers could be addressed by the department by implementing the Greenhouse Gas Technical Assistance Provider and Third-Party Verifier Program.

In February 2024, the Department of Agriculture released a report announcing that Secretary of Agriculture Tom Vilsack had determined that the department would establish the program.

==== EBSA ====
In March 2021, the Employee Benefits Security Administration (EBSA) of the U.S. Labor Department announced that it would review and not enforce a Trump administration final rule for fiduciaries in proxy voting under the Employee Retirement Income Security Act of 1974 (ERISA) to consider pecuniary interests only and not environmental, social, and corporate governance (ESG) factors in investments for 401(k)s pursuant to Executive Order 13990.

In October 2021, EBSA proposed reversing the Trump administration ERISA final rule for fiduciaries in proxy voting on ESG investments for 401(k)s.

In November 2022, EBSA announced a final rule removing the Trump administration pecuniary interest-only requirement for fiduciaries in proxy voting under ERISA when considering ESG investments for 401(k)s.

In March 2023, in the first veto of his administration, Biden rejected a bill passed by the 118th United States Congress on party-line votes to overturn the EBSA ERISA 401(k) fiduciary proxy voting rule for ESG investments which had been finalized the previous November.

==== Federal Reserve and Treasury ====
In August 2021, the Federal Insurance Office (FIO) of the U.S. Treasury Department issued an RFI for climate-related financial risks to the U.S. insurance industry pursuant to Executive Order 14030.

In November 2021, Acting Comptroller of the Currency Michael J. Hsu stated, at a conference hosted by The Wall Street Journal for sustainable business, that climate risk guidance for bank stress tests issued by his office would be consistent with stress test principles proposed by the Network for Greening the Financial System (NGFS). The next month, the Office of the Comptroller of the Currency (OCC) released a draft regulatory guidance statement to banks for identifying climate risks and for climate risk management (CRM).

In February 2022, the FIO announced that it had joined the NGFS. In March, the Federal Deposit Insurance Corporation (FDIC) issued a request for public comment on draft guidance for CRM for financial institutions with over $100 billion in assets. In September, the OCC announced the appointment of a chief climate risk officer who would report directly to the comptroller. In October, the FIO issued a request for comment on a proposed home and property insurance data collection effort, aggregated at the ZIP Code level, to assess climate-related impacts on insurability pursuant to Executive Order 14030. In December, the OCC chief climate risk officer stated, at a conference hosted by Ceres, that the OCC climate risk regulatory guidance for banks was issued to encourage banking institutions to adopt CRM policies and not to promote carbon neutrality pledges. In the same month, the Federal Reserve also issued a request for public comment on draft guidance for CRM for financial institutions with over $100 billion in assets.

In January 2023, the Federal Reserve announced that the six largest U.S. banks (Bank of America, Citigroup, Goldman Sachs, JPMorgan Chase, Morgan Stanley, and Wells Fargo) would have until July 31 to complete a pilot climate scenario exercise analysis of climate risks to their loan portfolios and commercial real estate holdings in the Northeastern United States. In June, the FIO released a report pursuant to Executive Order 14030 that found that climate risk oversight was becoming increasingly critical for state insurance regulators; along with the National Association of Insurance Commissioners (NAIC), state regulators had been incorporating climate risk into supervision and regulation of the U.S. insurance industry, though most efforts remained preliminary. In October, the OCC, the FDIC, and the Federal Reserve issued joint non-binding regulatory guidance for CRM for financial institutions with over $100 billion in assets. In November, the FIO submitted its home and property insurance data collection request to the Office of Management and Budget for review and clearance under the Paperwork Reduction Act.

In March 2024, the NAIC sent letters to 400 home insurance companies requesting detailed data on policy pricing and structuring to investigate affordability and availability issues of home insurance in collaboration with the FIO. In May, the Federal Reserve released a summary of the results of the pilot exercise analysis; it found that the participating banks had significant modeling difficulties due to a lack comprehensive and consistent data on building characteristics, insurance coverage, and counter-party CRM policies. The summary ultimately concluded that better understanding and monitoring of indirect socioeconomic impacts from climate change and chronic climate risks were important for CRM; that insurance performs a crucial role in climate risk mitigation for consumers, businesses, and banks; that changes in the insurance industry need to be monitored; and that climate risks were highly uncertain and difficult to measure to the point where the participating banks had difficulty determining how to incorporate climate risks into business-as-usual frameworks for risk management.

==== FTC ====
In December 2022, the Federal Trade Commission (FTC) announced that it was seeking public comment until February 21, 2023 for potential revisions to agency guidelines made pursuant to Section 5 of the Federal Trade Commission Act of 1914 for preventing deceptive green marketing practices for claims about carbon offsets, compostability, biodegradability, oxo-biodegradability, photodegradability, ozone safety, recyclability, recycled content, energy use and energy efficiency, organic products, and sustainability.

In January 2023, the FTC extended the public comment window for the revisions to its green marketing guidelines until April 24. In March, the FTC announced that it would host a workshop about recycling marketing claims as part of its review for its green marketing guidelines on May 23.

==== SEC and Justice Department ====
In February 2021, Acting U.S. Securities and Exchange Commission (SEC) Chair Allison Lee announced that the SEC would open a review of climate-related disclosures for public companies to update regulatory guidance that the agency had issued in 2010 for such disclosures.

Later that March, the SEC announced that examination of regulatory compliance related to disclosures for climate change and ESG would be an area of focus for the agency in 2021. The SEC also announced the creation of a task force to pursue enforcement cases against investment fund managers and public companies for deceptive marketing regarding ESG investment funds, as well as for false or misleading statements in climate risk disclosures.

In August, the SEC and the Eastern New York U.S. Attorney's Office were reportedly investigating the DWS Group (the asset management division of Deutsche Bank) after its former chief sustainability officer leaked internal emails and company presentations to The Wall Street Journal, showing that the company had overstated its ESG investment efforts.

In remarks made by video conference to the European Parliament Committee on Economic and Monetary Affairs in September, SEC Chair Gary Gensler stated that the agency was preparing recommendations for new disclosure requirements for ESG investment funds. Also that month, the SEC released a list of letters sent to the chief financial officers of certain public companies to request that the companies provide greater information to investors about climate risks to financial earnings or business operations.

In November, the SEC rescinded a Trump administration rule issued in 2017 which permitted company managers to exclude ESG proposals from shareholders in annual proxy statements. In December, the U.S. Justice Department informed Deutsche Bank that it may have violated its deferred prosecution agreement from the previous January by failing to inform prosecutors of their former chief sustainability officer's internal complaint about the DWS Group's overstating of its ESG investment efforts.

In March 2022, the SEC approved a rules proposal to require the disclosure of climate risks, CRM policies, and carbon footprint accounting (including the use of carbon offsets) by public companies in 10-K forms and other SEC filings pursuant to Sections 7, 10, 19(a), and 28 of the Securities Act of 1933 and Sections 3(b), 12, 13, 15, 23(a), and 36 of the Securities Exchange Act of 1934. This was modeled on the recommendations of the Task Force on Climate-related Financial Disclosures. In the same month, Deutsche Bank agreed to extend the term of an external compliance monitor until February 2023, from its 2015 settlement with the Justice Department, in order to address its failure to disclose the internal ESG complaint from its former chief sustainability officer the previous August.

In May, the SEC extended the public comment window for its climate disclosure rule proposal until June 17 and proposed two rules changes to ESG investment fund qualifications that would prevent greenwashing marketing practices and increase disclosure requirements for achieving ESG impacts.

In June, the SEC was reportedly investigating the ESG investment funds of Goldman Sachs for potential greenwashing. In testimony before the U.S. Senate Banking, Housing, and Urban Affairs Committee in September, Gensler stated that public companies subject to the carbon footprint disclosure rule would not be required to solicit carbon footprint accounting from their small business suppliers.

Later, in October, the SEC announced that it would re-open the public comment windows for the climate disclosure rule proposal and for the ESG disclosure rules proposal due to a technical error with the SEC public comment internet submission form.

In November, Goldman Sachs agreed to pay $4 million to settle the SEC investigation of the company's ESG funds for greenwashing without admitting or denying guilt of the SEC's allegations.

In February 2023, the SEC Division of Examinations announced that oversight of ESG investment funds would be among the six top priorities for the agency in 2023. Gensler stated in an interview that the agency was making adjustments to the climate disclosure rule, proposed the previous March, after the agency had received nearly 15,000 public comments on the rule proposal.

In March, Gensler suggested in an interview with the Council of Institutional Investors that the Scope 3 emissions disclosure requirement included in the climate disclosure rule proposal could be scaled back due to Scope 3 emissions accounting being less well-developed. He also stated that the climate disclosure rule proposal had received the largest number of public comments for a rule proposal in the agency's history.

In April, Gensler testified before the U.S. House Financial Services Committee on the climate disclosure rule proposal. Later, in September, Gensler stated, in testimony before the Senate Banking Committee, that agency staff had been reviewing the public comments on the climate disclosure rule proposal with a particular focus on Scope 3 reporting and reiterated that the proposed rule would apply only to public companies.

In remarks made after a speech given at Yale Law School in February 2024, Gensler stated that the climate disclosure rule was being drafted to withstand judicial scrutiny. He referred to anticipated litigation over the rule as part of the rule-making process.

In March, the SEC voted to issue the final rule on climate risk, climate risk management, and carbon footprint accounting. While the SEC final rule removed mandatory Scope 3 emissions reporting, more than 3,000 U.S. publicly traded companies were still required to disclose such emissions under European Union law. This also applied to companies with more than $1 billion in annual revenue under California state law at the time of the SEC final rule approval. In the same month, the U.S. 5th Circuit Court of Appeals granted an administrative stay of the rule's implementation in a lawsuit challenging the rule, and the SEC announced that it would stay implementation of the rule while legal challenges were consolidated before the U.S. 8th Circuit Court of Appeals.

=== CCS and CDR industry policies ===
In February 2021, the Biden administration announced that it would steer $30 billion in farm aid from the Commodity Credit Corporation toward farmers implementing regenerative farming practices (e.g. carbon farming) to enhance carbon sequestration. Under the Infrastructure Investment and Jobs Act that Biden later signed into law later that November, an additional $12 billion appropriation was made for carbon capture and sequestration (CCS) projects.

In May 2022, the U.S. Department of Energy announced a $3.5 billion program funded under the Infrastructure Investment and Jobs Act to create four large-scale regional direct air capture (DAC) hubs, each consisting of a network of carbon dioxide removal (CDR) projects. Under the CHIPS and Science Act that Biden signed into law later that August, a $1 billion appropriation was included to fund CDR research, development, and deployment.

Under the Inflation Reduction Act (IRA) that Biden also signed into law in August 2022, a $20 billion appropriation was made to the Natural Resources Conservation Service (NRCS) for oversubscribed programs (including the Environmental Quality Incentives Program and the Conservation Stewardship Program) to assist farmers with conservation practices that would reduce greenhouse gas emissions and increase carbon sequestration in soil and trees (and other climate-smart agricultural practices). Additionally, the IRA authorized the creation of the Energy Infrastructure Reinvestment (EIR) Program, a $5 billion loan guarantee program for projects to repurpose shuttered fossil fuel energy production facilities for clean energy production or to update existing energy production facilities with emissions control technologies including CCS. The IRA also increased the Section 45Q federal tax credit for CCS projects to $85 per metric ton of CO_{2} sequestered from $50 per ton, as well as for DAC projects to $180 per metric ton of permanent CDR from $50 per ton. Meanwhile, the tax credit for the use of captured CO_{2} for enhanced oil recovery (EOR) or other uses was increased to $60 per metric ton from $35 per metric ton for CCS and to $130 per metric ton from $35 per metric ton for DAC.

In October 2022, the Global CCS Institute (of which the U.S. Department of Energy is a member organization) released a report on the global status of CCS projects. It stated that there were 13 operational projects, 68 projects in development, and 2 projects with suspended operations in the United States, among 61 new CCS projects that had been announced over the previous year and 196 projects that were operational or in development worldwide in total.

=== Energy efficiency ===
The executive order requiring federal agencies to cut emissions, issued on December 8, 2021, contained measures about energy efficiency (sections 205, 206, 605). By the end of that year, the Biden administration also reversed some of the rules established under Trump that reduced energy efficiency, but many of them remained in place.

The administration released unprecedented funding for energy efficiency and weatherization. The Weatherization Assistance Program alone gave $3.5 billion for the effort, resulting in 700,000 low-income households that increased energy efficiency and paid less for energy; $8.7 billion was spent through the Low-Income Home Energy Assistance Program (LIHEAP). The latter program primarily helped households with children, elderly individuals, and people with disabilities.

In June 2022, Biden announced a new initiative for increasing energy efficiency in buildings, thus reducing payments for energy from households at the same time. At least $225 million was scheduled to be spent on it.

In February 2023, the United States Department of Energy proposed a set of new energy efficiency standards that, if implemented, would save users of different electric machines in America around $3,500,000,000 per year. It would also reduce carbon emissions, by the same amount emitted by 29,000,000 houses, by the year 2050.

In October of that year, the Senate, in a bipartisan vote, rejected a proposal that could hurt policies promoting energy efficiency in houses. An opponent of the proposal argued the policies can save a homeowner $15,000 on average. However, the amount of money expected to be saved was not uniform but largely depended on climate zone. Nonetheless, the report divided the country into 8 zones ranging from a very hot and humid climate (zone 1) to a subarctic and arctic climate (zone 8). Savings thus vary "from as low as $7,536 in Climate Zone 2, to a high of $46,836 in Climate Zone 8."

=== Land and ocean conservation ===
Biden's administration set a goal of protecting 30% of the land and the water of the U.S. In 2021, 12% of land and 26% of water were protected. The plan for achieving the target was called "America the Beautiful" and included many measures like expanding urban green spaces and collaboration with indigenous people. The initiative additionally included $1 billion in grants for community-based conservation and restoration projects.

In October 2021, President Biden announced the expansion of the Bears Ears National Monument, the Grand Staircase–Escalante National Monument, and the Northeast Canyons and Seamounts Marine National Monument, thus restoring the original areas and protections that were reduced by President Trump. He also created the Camp Hale–Continental Divide National Monument in 2022, as well as the Avi Kwa Ame, Castner Range, and Baaj Nwaavjo I'tah Kukveni – Ancestral Footprints of the Grand Canyon National Monuments in 2023 and the Chuckwalla and Sáttítla Highlands National Monuments in 2025. He also expanded the San Gabriel Mountains and Berryessa Snow Mountain National Monuments in 2024.

In March 2023, Biden directed the Department of Commerce to designate the Pacific Remote Islands as a National Marine Sanctuary, thus expanding the protections of Pacific Islands Heritage Marine National Monument. The department also designated the Lake Ontario National Marine Sanctuary and the Chumash Heritage National Marine Sanctuary in 2024.

Biden's administration launched a plan for protecting the oceans called the Ocean Climate Action Plan. It has included measures for protecting and restoring many marine and coastal ecosystems, thus mitigating climate change with the help of these ecosystems and helping communities depending on them.

According to a report from the Center for American Progress, the Biden administration reached a record in conservation. In 3 years, it conserved or began the process of conserving more than 24 millions acres of public land. In 2023 alone, more than 12.5 million acres of public land became protected. Efforts done together with Indigenous peoples were also recognized, as 200 agreements of co-stewardship with them were signed in 2023 alone.

In April 2024, Biden unveiled a plan to protect and restore natural water sources—3.2 million hectares of wetlands and 161,000 km of rivers and streams. In the same month, the Interior Department issued a new rule that would allow 245 million acres of federal property to be leased for conservation purposes. The rule specifically resembled the way oil companies leased land for drilling, specifically by raising conservation, recreation, and renewable energy development to the same legal status that such drilling has enjoyed. The rule was intended to help protect public lands from the impacts of climate change and development. Some Republicans have ridiculed the move as a "land grab" and talked of a legal challenge.

In 2025, President Biden permanently banned oil and gas drilling on 625 million acres of federal waters.

=== Oil and gas pipelines ===
The Biden administration showed support for the Line 3 pipeline owned by the Canadian corporation Enbridge. However, the pipeline still faced significant resistance as of September 2021.

In January of that year, President Biden halted further development of the Keystone Pipeline by way of an executive order which also directed agencies to review and reverse more than 100 Trump administration actions on the environment. In June 2021, the pipeline project was canceled. It was considered an environmental threat by environmentalists, indigenous peoples, and the Biden administration.

=== Environmental reviews of projects ===
In January 2021, Biden took some actions to improve the link between science and the policies of his administration on environmental issues. Actions included improving the environmental reviews of big projects before they were approved according to the NEPA, improving the function of the Environmental Protection Agency, and reestablishing a scientific body to calculate the social cost of all greenhouse gases, not just carbon dioxide. He also ordered a stop to the oil and gas drilling in the Arctic National Wildlife Refuge. Biden additionally stated that the voices of indigenous peoples should be taken into consideration in the process of approving projects. He also began the process of installing standards for methane emissions.

In October of that year, the Biden administration filed an application for a mineral withdrawal which would put a hold on the development of a copper mine near Ely, Minnesota while the environmental impacts of mining were studied. The proposed mine is located on the watershed of the Boundary Waters Canoe Area Wilderness, an area that has been popular for canoeing, fishing, and hiking and is among the country's most visited wilderness areas. The Obama administration had launched a similar study, but 24-weeks into the 28-week study, the newly elected Trump administration ended it, thus allowing the plans for the mining operation to continue. The completed study could lead to a 20-year ban on mining upstream from the BWCAW.

In April 2022, the Biden administration restored components of an environmental law (NEPA) from the 1970s that were abolished by Trump. The components required consideration of climate impacts and local community interests before approving major projects.

In January 2024, Biden's administration announced a pause in the approval of projects linked to the export of liquefied natural gas (LNG) to countries which were not members of free trade agreements with the U.S. until the environmental impacts were fully reviewed. As a result, a number of projects linked with very high amounts of greenhouse gas emissions could be canceled. Subsequently, the climate movement hailed the decision, and a planned protest of environmentalists was canceled. However, Republicans and the fossil fuel industry showed support for the threatened projects, stating they would be needed for the U.S. economy and security, especially due to the Russian invasion of Ukraine. (The U.S. is currently the biggest producer and consumer of oil and gas and, recently, became the biggest gas exporter to European countries which want to stop using Russian gas.) Some scientists say LNG is better than coal, while others argue it is worse due to high methane emissions. Ultimately, however, the U.S. LNG export capacity is expected to be twice as big in 2027 due to already approved projects.

In July 2024, after 16 Republican-governed states sued, Judge James D. Cain Jr. issued an injunction on the suspension of LNG export regulatory approvals.

While in hospice care in his home, former President Jimmy Carter contacted President Joe Biden and court officials, via amicus brief, to discourage the construction of a gravel roadway in Alaska on the Arctic National Wildlife Refuge. Biden agreed with Carter, and the project was dismissed in 2023 by the Department of the Interior.

=== Drilling on public lands ===
One week after becoming president, Biden signed several executive orders aimed at combatting climate change and protecting the environment. He ordered the Interior Secretary to stop new oil and gas drilling in federal lands and water; he also ordered a review of existing projects. However, these pauses were only temporary and didn't stop drilling permanently. Another order established a target of protecting 30% of United States lands and waters by 2030; it also set in motion the creation of a plan for climate financing and a climate target for the U.S. Biden additionally signed a presidential memorandum establishing a process for documenting any instances in which "improper political interference" interfered with research or distorted data.

In response to reviews, the Interior Department stopped many of the oil and gas drilling projects, took measures for the protection of wild animals, and restored national monuments. It also began preparing a review of the entire oil and gas leasing program in the U.S. However, the Biden administration did show support for an oil drilling project, known as Willow, which had been approved by the Trump administration. This decision was criticized by environmentalists.

In early June 2021, the Interior Department suspended all oil and gas leases in the Arctic National Wildlife Refuge. This national wildlife refuge includes around 20 million acres where snowy owls, caribou, and other endangered wildlife live. Days later, a federal court issued a temporary injunction against the Interior Department action, pending litigation filed by more than a dozen states.

In 2021, attorneys general from Republican states successfully sued to lift the suspension that Biden had placed on the selling of federal gas and oil leases. On September 17, energy companies, including Chevron, ExxonMobil, and Shell, bid $192 million for drilling rights on federal gas and oil reserves in the Gulf of Mexico. In November 2021, it was reported that the Biden administration was preparing to lease around 80 million acres to gas and oil drilling companies. More than 250 indigenous, social justice, and environmental groups wrote a letter to the Biden administration asking him to keep his promise to end new leases on public waters and lands and stop the impending lease which they believed "makes a mockery" of the COP26 climate commitments. The lease sale in the Gulf of Mexico was further criticized after the Department of Justice debunked the justification that the sale was legally required by the June 2021 ruling which blocked the pause on oil leases.

In January 2022, a federal judge remanded the lease auction back to the Bureau of Ocean Energy Management for relying on a distorted Trump-era environmental impact assessment. The administration also proposed another round of gas and oil lease sales in 2022 in the states of Colorado, Montana, Wyoming, and other western states.

Later, in February, the Biden administration suspended any further oil and gas leases on public lands. The decision came after a Trump-appointed judge reversed the social cost of carbon of $51 per ton—the figure established by Obama and restored by Biden—back to $7 per ton which had been Trump's cost estimate. The reversal was a result of a suit by 10 Republican attorneys general.

In May 2022, the administration abolished three leases in the Gulf of Mexico and Alaska. One of the reasons was "a lack of industry interest".

=== Renewable energy ===
In his proposed 2022 budget, the Biden administration proposed a $10 billion investment in clean energy research and development—an increase of 30%. The budget also proposed $2 billion to be invested in green energy projects while also setting aside reserves of $6.5 billion to lend to rural communities in support of additional green energy, power storage, and transmission projects. Biden also ordered the amount of energy produced from offshore wind turbines to be doubled by 2030.

In April 2023, the Biden administration announced that it would make $450 million in funding available through the Infrastructure Investment and Jobs Act for clean energy demonstration projects in coal mining communities to convert current and former mines into clean energy projects. It also announced $16 million in funding to the University of North Dakota and West Virginia University to create design studies for a full-scale refinery facility to extract and separate rare-earth elements and other minerals (including those needed in electric vehicle batteries) from coal ash, acid mine drainage, and other mine waste.

In May 2024, the Biden administration doubled tariffs on solar cells imported from China. it also more than tripled tariffs on lithium-ion electric vehicle batteries imported from China. The increased tariffs were to be phased in over a period of three years.

=== Nuclear energy ===
$6.6 billion was provided in the new infrastructure law to keep older nuclear power plants from being prematurely decommissioned. Biden initiatives also fully funded two new reactor demonstration projects, X-energy and TerraPower.

In 2024, with overwhelming majorities, Congress passed S. 870, containing the ADVANCE Act, which directs the Nuclear Regulatory Commission to improve its assessments of new nuclear technology and fuels, cuts regulatory approval costs for advanced reactor designs, creates a grant prize competition for deployment of Generation IV reactors, and streamlines Energy Department export controls for nuclear technology.

=== Fossil fuel subsidies ===
The Biden administration has delivered a tax plan to Congress that aims to start winding back fossil fuel subsidies by replacing the subsidies with incentives to start producing green energy. It was estimated that ending tax subsidies for those companies could save the American taxpayer $121 billion over the course of the next decade.

Biden also stated his ambition to make the U.S. power sector completely free of fossil fuels by 2035, as well as his intention to bring a law to Congress with a legal commitment to make the grid 80% clean by 2030. Biden also made a commitment to ensure that all federal vehicles were electric, and in a series of executive orders at the beginning of his presidency, Biden ordered an increase in the production of renewable energy on federal lands and water, the creation of the Civilian Climate Corps, and a mandate making the fossil fuel companies responsible for repairing faults leading to environmental damage. As a part of a commitment to environmental justice, Biden also stated that 40% of all climate investments would be sent to the most historically vulnerable communities, after which he created a special body for dealing with the issue: the White House Environmental Justice Interagency Council.

=== Deforestation and wildlife ===
On the first day of his presidency, the Biden administration ordered a broad review of Trump-era policies pertaining to wildlife in the United States, including the gutting of the Migratory Birds Treaty Act and Trump's decision to strip a number of animals, including gray wolves and the northern spotted owl, of their protections under the Endangered Species Act.

In June 2021, the Biden administration announced that it was beginning the process of restoring and strengthening wildlife protections that had been loosened under the Trump Administration, mainly in regards to the weakening of protections granted to endangered animals under the Endangered Species Act and the extent to which their habitats would be protected.

In June 2022, the Biden administration restored a rule that broadened the definition of a “critical habitat” and allowed more protection of endangered species. This reversed a rule that Trump had put into place right before leaving office; it limited the definition of a “critical habitat” to areas that could have sustained endangered species at the time, excluding places that could potentially sustain them in the future.

In November 2021, Biden promised to end and reverse deforestation and land degradation by 2030 via the COP26 climate summit's first major agreement. In the same month, the Financial Crimes Enforcement Network issued an advisory to financial institutions to increase scrutiny of financial transactions potentially tied to wildlife trafficking, illegal logging, and illegal fishing. Such an advisory was the first in the agency's history intended to prevent environmental crimes.

=== Transportation ===
The transportation sector has been the biggest emitter of CO_{2} in America, and reducing transportation emissions would require a large-scale transition to carbon-free transportation. Biden thus promised to give all cities with populations greater than 100,000 people quality public transportation with low carbon options. United States Secretary of Transportation Pete Buttigieg was directed to work toward achieving the goals, but nothing was put into action as of June 2021. Biden also declared plans to increase the use of "zero carbon" transportation like cycling and walking.

In August 2021, the EPA proposed new light-duty vehicle greenhouse gas emission standards for model years 2023 through 2026. The 2023 target would call for a 9.8% reduction over the 2022 target, with subsequent year-over-year reductions of approximately 5%.

In December 2021, new greenhouse gas emissions standards for vehicles were adopted. They were 6% stronger than the original proposition made in August and were estimated to prevent the emission of 3.1 billion tons of CO_{2} into the atmosphere. The benefits of the new standards surpassed the cost by $190 billion, including savings on fuel and reduction of the impacts of climate change and air pollution. According to the EPA, the reduction was "equivalent to more than half the total U.S. CO_{2} emissions in 2019". The rules were also intended to cut emissions from passenger cars and trucks (17% of the US greenhouse gas emissions) by 5%–10% in the years 2023–2026.

The Infrastructure Investment and Jobs Act includes:

- $7.5 billion to build a national network of electric vehicle chargers
- $5 billion for a "Clean School Bus Program"
- $350 million for new wildlife crossings and corridors pilot project
- $250 million for an electric or low-emissions ferry pilot program
- $250 million to reduce truck idling at ports

Additionally, Biden's administration promoted transit-oriented development, walkability, cycling, and mixed-use development, among other developments, by creating community-based transport hubs. This was done mainly in low-income neighborhoods. $1 billion was also allocated to spend on reconnecting neighborhoods.

In April 2023, the EPA proposed new tailpipe emissions limits which the agency estimated could require 67% of all new automobiles sold in the U.S. to be electric by 2032, thus surpassing the previous commitment by the Biden administration under Executive Order 14037 for electric cars to make up 50 percent of new automobile sales by 2030.

In November 2023, a new federal rule was adopted. It required local authorities to measure GHG emissions from transportation and prepare a plan for how to reduce them with concrete targets February 1, 2024; progress would be measured every 2 years. Support of EV use, walking and cycling, and prioritizing maintenance of existing roads instead of building new ones, among other efforts, were proposed as measures to achieve the needed reduction. Some states cheered the new rule, while others opposed it. The Federal Highway Administrator Shailen Bhatt expressed hope for more support, stating that climate disasters were becoming more frequent. He also stated that his agency received requests for help worth around $1 billion due to such climate disasters in a single year.

=== Agriculture ===
Biden pledged to cut emissions from the agriculture sector in the US by 50% by 2030.

In February 2022, the United States Department of Agriculture begun to implement a program designed to cut greenhouse gas emissions from the agricultural sector in the U.S.; by then, the sector accounted for over 10% of the overall emissions. Additionally, the agriculture sector in the U.S. had already heavily suffered from different impacts of climate change. The program included $1 billion in spending on methods like no-till farming, crop rotation, carbon capture and storage, manure management, and rotational grazing. The program also included measures regarding forests.

In October 2023, the Senate approved $8.5 million in funding for urban agriculture.

=== Helping non-governmental organizations ===
Biden delivered $27 billion from the Greenhouse Gas Reduction Fund (funded by the Inflation Reduction Act) to eight environmental non-governmental organizations. The Fund's investments are supposed to reduce the CO_{2} emissions of the US by 40 million tonnes per year while delivering 70% of the benefits to low-income communities. The money was allowed to be disbursed to tens of thousands of different projects such as, for instance, making energy efficient houses.

=== Indigenous people ===
The administration spent many efforts on enhancing cooperation with the Indigenous peoples of the Americas, among others, by creating a consultation mechanism for assuring their voice would be heard for environmental justice initiatives. Different tribes and villages received help via protection from the different effects of climate change.

The Biden administration provided a total of $120 million to support tribes impacted by the effects of climate change. The funding consisted of $25 million from the annual allocations for fiscal year 2023, $72 million from the Inflation Reduction Act, and $23 million from the Infrastructure Investment and Jobs Act. The program covered a variety of initiatives including planning for climate adaptation, drought management, wildland fire mitigation measures, community-driven relocation, and management of the ocean and coastline.

On October 8, 2021, Joe Biden delivered the first-ever presidential proclamation of Indigenous Peoples' Day, providing the most substantial boost yet to efforts to redirect the federal holiday commemorating Christopher Columbus toward an appreciation of Indigenous people. On the same day, the Biden administration unveiled its plans to restore land for two significant national monuments in Utah which Trump had previously stripped of protections. One of them, Bears Ears National Monument, is situated on what Indigenous tribes recognize as sacred ground.

== International policy ==
=== Paris climate agreement ===
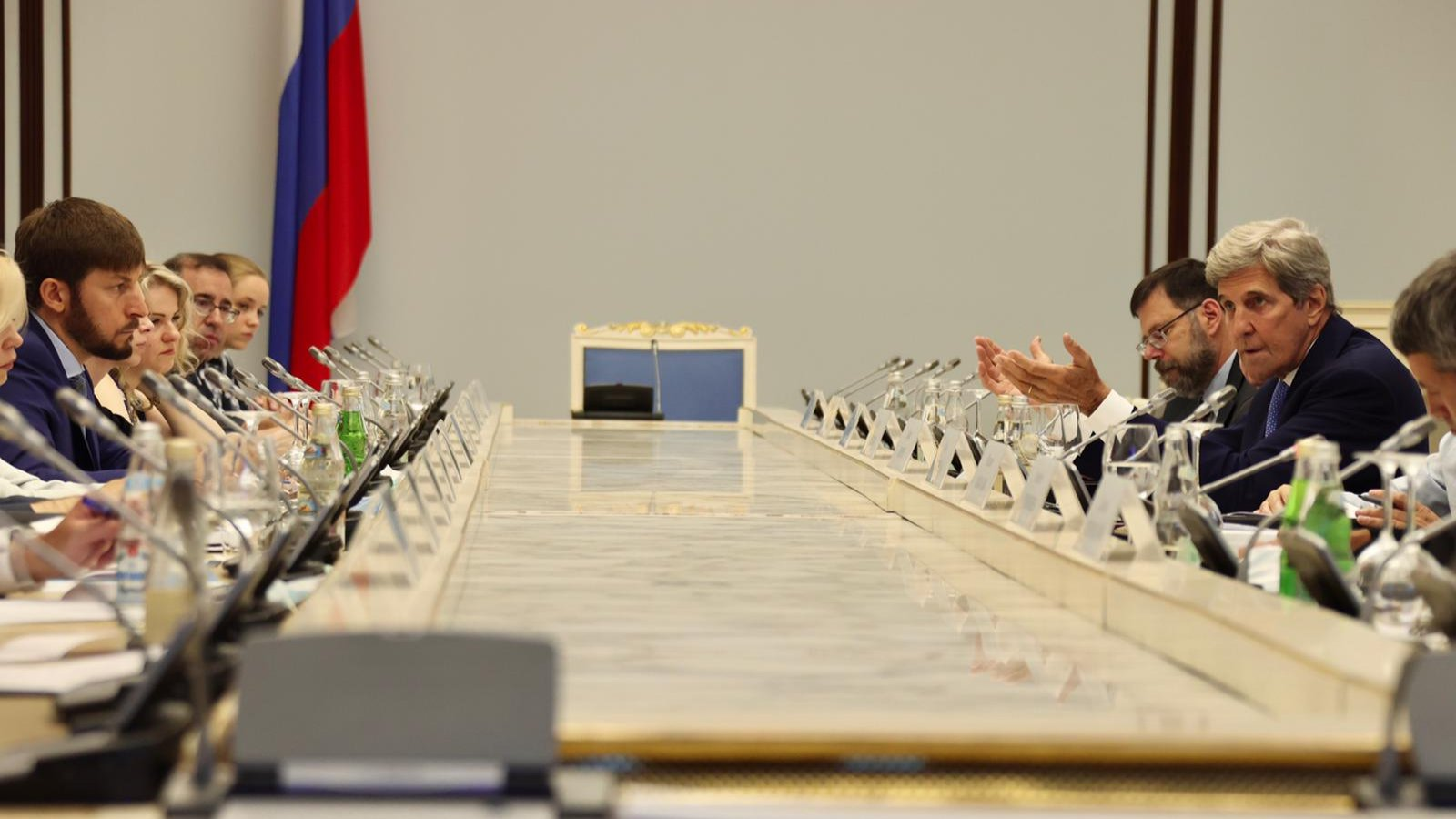
John Kerry (right), U.S. Special Presidential Envoy for Climate, and his Russian counterpart Ruslan Edelgeriyev in Moscow on July 12, 2021

Upon his first hours in office, President Biden signed an executive order bringing the United States back into the Paris Climate Agreement; President Trump had announced the country's withdrawal in 2017. The move was welcomed by environmental groups and by the Union of Concerned Scientists.

The Secretary-General of the United Nations, António Guterres, congratulated Biden, stating that with the U.S. rejoining the agreement, all the countries responsible for two-thirds of the global greenhouse gas emission made pledges to become carbon neutral; without the United States, it had been only half. President of France Emmanuel Macron congratulated Biden saying, 'Welcome back to the Paris Agreement!'

In February 2021, The United States officially rejoined the Paris Agreement. Speaking about the occasion, John Kerry mentioned the urgent need to act on climate change in the next 10 years, the impact that climate change would have on the future, and the impacts that already had, such as the latest extreme cold events in the U.S. that, in his opinion, were "related to climate because the polar vortex penetrates further south because of the weakening of the jet stream related to warming." This opinion has been shared by many climate scientists.

One week after he became president, Biden also began the process of creating a special plan for providing financial help for low-income countries in addressing issues related to climate change mitigation and climate change adaptation.

In February 2021, Biden issued an order to begin the process of identification of climate refugees and finding ways to help them.

The Biden administration also urged China to speed up its commitment to becoming carbon neutral, with John Kerry stating that China's pledge to reach net-zero emissions by 2060 was "not good enough".

=== 2021 climate leaders summit ===
On April 22–23, 2021, Biden hosted a virtual climate summit with 40 world leaders. The gathering had been organized by the administration.

At the summit, Biden announced a new target for the U.S., as it had no Nationally Determined Contribution due to its withdrawal from the Paris Agreement in 2017. The new target aimed to reduce GHG emissions by 50%–52% by 2030 relative to the level of 2005, which was the amount specified by experts to adequately limit temperature rise. The new target was described as a considerable step forward in the fight against climate change—though still not enough to limit global temperature rise to under the 1.5 °C target. Overall, the commitments made at the summit reduced the gap between the government's current pledges and the 1.5 °C target by 12% to 14%. Upon the new pledge's accomplishment, global emissions by 2030 would fall by 2.6% to 3.7% GtCO_{2}e more than they would have with the pledges before the summit.

At the beginning of May 2021, Climate Action Tracker released a more detailed report about the significance of the summit. According to the report, the summit, together with other pledges made from September 2020, would reduce the expected rise in temperature by 2100 by 0.2 °C. If all pledges were fulfilled, they predicted that temperatures would rise by 2.4 °C rather than the 2.9 °C increase that would arise from status quo operations. In the most optimistic scenario, if the countries also fulfilled the pledges that are not part of the Paris Agreement, temperatures would rise by 2.0 °C.

Biden's administration also launched a number of coalitions and initiatives aimed at stopping climate change and helping to reduce its impacts. These included a Global Climate Ambition Initiative for helping low-income countries to achieve emissions targets, as well as a "Net-Zero Producers Forum, with Canada, Norway, Qatar, and Saudi Arabia, together representing 40% of global oil and gas production"

=== United Nations climate summits ===
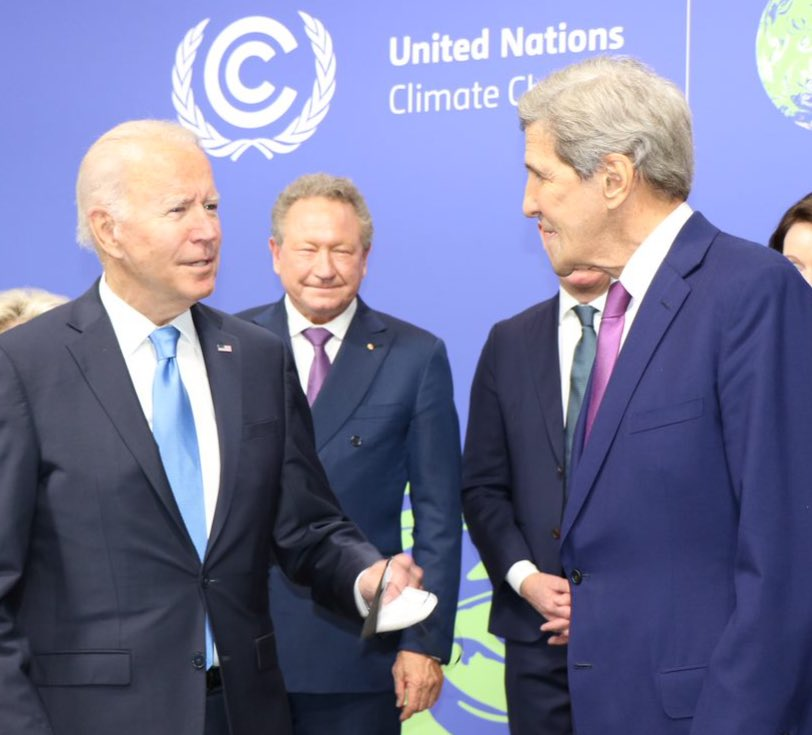
John Kerry joins Joe Biden at the First Movers Coalition of COP26.

In November 2021, world leaders met at the 2021 United Nations Climate Change Conference (COP26) to negotiate goals to reduce global warming. While there was some progress attained, it has since been believed that the agreements reached were not sufficient to avoid the worst damage.

Developing countries, which were already facing hardships due to intense droughts and flooding, asked that developed countries, largely responsible for global warming, establish a fund to help them cope. Some nations, including the U.S., refused.

One of the successes of the conference was the U.S. and China agreement on fighting climate change together. The framework includes commitments to:

- Working for achieving halt in temperature rise on 2 and preferably 1.5 °C, global Carbon neutrality
- Establishing environmental standards and policies needed for the transition to clean economy
- Moving toward Circular economy
- Control and reduce Methane emissions; China would specifically adopt a national methane reduction plan as the U.S. has already done, and in the first half of 2022, both countries would convene a meeting to accelerate the process
- Increase Energy efficiency and usage of Renewable energy; the U.S. specifically vowed to make its electricity sector carbon pollution-free by 2035
- Working to stop globally the use of unabated thermal coal power generation; China would lower the use of coal as much as possible during its 15th five-year plan
- Working to stop illegal deforestation by stopping illegal imports
- Giving financial and capacity building help to other countries
- Submitting new NDC to the year 2035 by 2025
- Create a special body, the "Working Group on Enhancing Climate Action in the 2020s," that would coordinate the implementation of such an agreement

At the conference, 40 countries, including the U.S. and five institutions, promised to stop financing carbon-intensive projects abroad by the end of 2022.

At the conference, the U.S. and United Arab Emirates launched an initiative called the Agriculture Innovation Mission for Climate (AIM for Climate). Later, in February 2022, the US gave $1 billion directed toward cutting greenhouse gases, specifically looking to cut from the agricultural sector. The initiative additionally needed another $8 billion for implementation.

=== Bilateral climate issues ===
The Biden administration ended the U.S.-China Clean Energy Research Center (CERC) established under Obama. CERC had been the most ambitious clean energy cooperation platform between the two countries and one of the few cooperation mechanisms that survived the Trump administration.

=== International carbon accounting reporting standards ===
In July 2023, the International Organization of Securities Commissions—of which the U.S. Securities and Exchange Commission and Commodity Futures Trading Commission have been board members and whose members agencies regulate more than 95 percent of worldwide market capitalization—endorsed the climate reporting standards created by the International Sustainability Standards Board (including for Scope 3 reporting).

== Reception ==
Environmental organizations and scientists responded positively to the Biden administration's actions on climate change on the first day of his presidency. The decisions taken one week later were similarly welcomed by environmental groups like the Natural Resources Defense Council, the Sunrise Movement and partially by the Indigenous Environmental Network. However, the Western Energy Alliance filed a lawsuit against the decision to stop giving new permits for oil and gas drilling in federal lands and waters, whilst the Indigenous Environmental Network stated that the decision did not go far enough. There was also concern that the ban on new oil and gas drilling on public lands would not reduce greenhouse gas emissions, as less than half of the existing permits were in use at the time.

Some criticized Biden's environmental policies on the premise that they would eliminate jobs—a popular Republican argument against Biden in the 2020 election. Biden countered by stating that his policies would actually create jobs in the transition to a green economy. There was also the argument that climate change, if not acted upon, would cause the loss of many more jobs than any climate action on the part of the Biden administration would. According to Energy Innovation, a program aimed at reaching zero emissions by 2050 could save the U.S. $3.5 trillion if it started implementation immediately, compared to a scenario in which it will begin to be implemented in 2030.

The Biden administration's environmental policy was characterized as a return to the Obama administration's climate change policy of reducing carbon emissions with the goal of conserving the environment for future generations. However, according to a letter sent to the administration by a group of young climate activists, returning to the policy of Obama and reaching carbon neutrality by 2050 would not be enough to stabilize the climate. Others also criticized Biden's environmental policies for being too conservative, believing that they weren't going far enough in comparison to policies put in place by politicians like the Green Party's Howie Hawkins, who had created the original version of the Green New Deal, or Biden's primary rival Bernie Sanders.

The attorneys general of 21 Republican-led states sued Biden for canceling the permit to build the Keystone XL pipeline. Additionally, the attorneys general of 14 Republican-led states sued him for the moratorium on new oil and gas leases on public lands and waters. Many of those states suffer from severe, climate change-induced heat waves and drought; farmers have been among the most affected.

In February 2022, around 100 religious leaders called Biden and Congress to pass Build Back Better on behalf of the climate; those included Christians, Jews, and others. Around 80% of Catholic women were members in the organizations that signed the letter; one of them mentioned that the bill established a spending of $555 billion through several years, while the Senate approved spending of $770 billion in one year for military tasks.

In 2024, several environmental organizations, including the Sierra Club, Sunrise Movement, and Earthjustice, issued a memorandum stating that Biden did more for the environment than any other president in history; they presented a list of 322 actions made by the administration to achieve the goal.

Some critics defined Biden climate policy as socialistic.

== Executive orders ==
- Executive Order 13990 (signed 20 January 2021): "Executive Order on Protecting Public Health and the Environment and Restoring Science to Tackle the Climate Crisis"
- Executive Order 14007 (signed 27 January 2021): "Executive Order on Establishing President's Council of Advisors on Science and Technology"
- Executive Order 14008 (signed 27 January 2021): "Executive Order on Tackling the Climate Crisis at Home and Abroad"
- Executive Order 14013 (signed 4 February 2021): "Rebuilding and Enhancing Programs to Resettle Refugees and Planning for the Impact of Climate Change on Migration"
- Executive Order 14057 (signed 8 December 2021): "Catalyzing Clean Energy Industries and Jobs Through Federal Sustainability"
- Executive Order 14096 (signed 21 April 2023): "Executive Order on Revitalizing Our Nation’s Commitment to Environmental Justice for All"
- "Memorandum on Restoring Trust in Government Through Scientific Integrity and Evidence-Based Policymaking" (signed 27 January 2021)
