= White House Office of Energy and Climate Change Policy =

U.S. government entity

Agency overview
- Website: www.whitehouse.gov/administration/executive-office-of-the-president/

The White House Office of Energy and Climate Change Policy was a government entity in the United States created in 2008 by President Barack Obama by Executive Order. It existed for over two years and was combined with another presidential office in April 2011. The office was created to coordinate administration policy on energy and global warming. Under the Biden administration, it has been succeeded by both the Office of Domestic Climate Policy and the Office on Clean Energy Innovation and Implementation.

== History ==
The office was created in December 2008. Its first (and only) director was Carol Browner, who was Administrator of the Environmental Protection Agency for the eight years of the Bill Clinton administration.

=== Barack Obama administration ===
President Obama launched the Major Economies Forum on Energy and Climate Change to facilitate candid dialogue among key developed and developing countries regarding efforts to advance clean energy and reduce greenhouse gas emissions. For the new forum, President Obama invited the leaders of 16 major economies and the Secretary General of the United Nations to designate representatives to participate in a preparatory session at the U.S. Department of State that occurred on April 27–28 in Washington, D.C. This and other preparatory sessions culminated in a 17-nation MEF meeting, as part of the 35th G8 summit which Italian Prime Minister Silvio Berlusconi agreed to host in La Maddalena, Italy, in July 2009. The G8 summit was subsequently moved to L'Aquila, Italy, as part of an attempt to redistribute disaster funds after the 2009 L'Aquila earthquake. The forum took place on July 9, 2009.

=== Elimination ===
In April 2011, it was reported that Congress would no longer fund the office in the 2011 budget. On March 2, 2011, the White House announced that the climate and energy work done by the office would be transferred to the Domestic Policy Council, thereby eliminating it as an office within the White House Office. It was succeeded in 2021 by the White House Office of Domestic Climate Policy, headed by the White House National Climate Advisor.

== See also ==
- Climate change policy of the United States
- EERE
- Foreign policy of the Barack Obama administration
- IRENA
- Major Economies Forum on Energy and Climate Change
- Nationally Appropriate Mitigation Action
- U.S. Special Presidential Envoy for Climate
- White House Climate Coordinator
- White House Office on Clean Energy Innovation and Implementation
