= Climate and energy =

List of Climatological research organizations

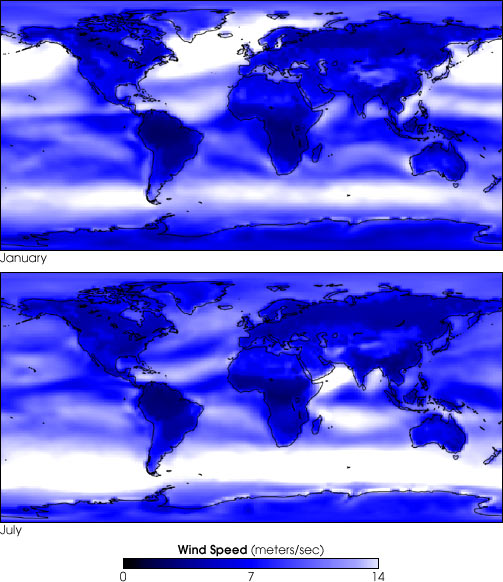
The world's climate determines the pattern of its winds. These winds are now increasingly used as a source of energy.

In the 21st century, the Earth's climate and its energy policy interact and their relationship is studied and governed by a variety of national and international institutions. The connection stems from the burning of fossil fuels like coal, oil, and natural gas, for electricity, heat, and transportation directly relating to greenhouse gases increasing the atmospheric temperature.

== Overview ==
The relationships between energy-resource depletion, climate change, health resources and the environment, and the effects that they have on each other, have been subject to numerous scientific studies and research efforts. As a result, a majority of governments see climate and energy as two of the most important policy goals of the twenty first century.

The correlation between climate and energy rests on known causal relationships between human population growth, rising energy consumption and land use and the resulting greenhouse gas emissions and climate change. Environmental harm was caused early on during the industrial revolution, with air pollution being caused by soot coming from factories, as well as the greenhouse gas carbon dioxide being emitted into the atmosphere due to the burning of coal.

The concern for climate change control and mitigation has consequently spurred policy makers and scientists to treat energy use and global climate as an inextricable nexus with effects also going in reverse direction and create various initiatives, institutions and think tanks for a high-level treatment of the relationships. The varying approaches that are highly flawed and hold us back as a society when trying to stabilize the global climate include efficiency improvements, superconducting global electric grids, geoengineering, hydrogen production, storage, and transport.

In recent years renewable energy sources, including solar and wind power, have widely been recognized as the most viable long-term strategy for reducing emissions and stabilizing the global climate. As of the early 2020s, solar and wind have become the cheapest sources of new electricity generation in most parts of the world, yet fossil fuels continue to supply the overwhelming majority of global energy.

== Worldwide Energy Usage ==
Due to the increase in global energy usage corresponding to population and economic growth the need for energy in areas like North America, Europe, East Asia, and South Asia is growing. Investments in clean energy tend to be concentrated in more developed regions, whereas regions that face extreme climate threats, such as sub-Saharan Africa and South Asia, do not get enough funding. Aims for increasing renewables by 50% or 70% have been seen in counties like the UAE and China, with policy incentives pushing the energy production economy to employ low carbon sources of energy generation.

In comparison to investments in clean energy, global fossil fuel subsidies have consistently remained higher than any other form of energy subsidy. The cost of replacing existing power infrastructure with renewables is a major determine as renewables still new subsidies to be competitive with tradition sources. However, addressing this issue is considered the simplest way of making changes, through providing policies that provide incentives, reducing financial risks, increasing clean energy permitting and restricting or disincentivizing harmful forms of energy production.

== Technology, Issues, and Potential Mitigation Measures ==
Decarbonizing the entire global energy supply chain is seen as one of the biggest engineering challenges of the century. The measures that can be used include making the current infrastructure more efficient, increasing production from renewable energy sources, improving the efficiency of storing energy, and designing new urban and transportation infrastructure that will consume less energy altogether.

However, some of the suggested methods require global initiatives using both emissions mitigation and carbon capture. The current methods employ technological advancements that include improving, hydro energy, biomass energy, Solar energy and hydrogen energy cells. These advancements along with global superconducting electric grid design, massive geoengineering, increased fuel cell applications and increased effective carbon capturing methods can be used in tandem with policy to eventually control pollution and transition from fossil fuels to sustainable energy sources.

There are deep links between advancements in renewable energy technology and its increasing implementation, as energy can be generated, stored, and transported more effectively, economically, and environmentally sustainably as more research, funding, and institutional backing are put into place.

== Policy Approaches ==
A variety of policy approaches have been adopted to facilitate the energy transition and mitigate the threat of climate change. The Green Deal adopted by the European Union is one of the most extensive measures undertaken. According to the initiative, climate neutrality should be achieved in the European Union no later than 2050, with a minimum reduction of greenhouse gas emissions of up to 55% in comparison with 1990 emission levels by 2030. Among other steps taken in relation to implementing the Green Deal are such as expanding the EU Emissions Trading System, stopping fossil fuel subsidies, and investing heavily in renewable energy infrastructure.

There were some challenges when implementing policy because of opposition views against moving towards zero-carbon economy coming from agriculture, industry, and politics as all of these areas might be affected. Some regulatory approaches were changed because of opposition to certain provisions, which indicates how difficult it was to balance economic and environmental factors when implementing policy.

Other than the European Union, many other national and international bodies have been created for the purpose of coordinating climate and energy policies. These include the Major Economies Forum on Energy and Climate Change, the U.S. House Select Committee on Energy Independence and Global Warming, and the UN program on Renewable Energy Sources and Climate Change Mitigation, among others.

- Major Economies Forum on Energy and Climate Change (global)
- Ministry of Climate, Energy and Utilities (Denmark)
- Business for Innovative Climate and Energy Policy (US)
- United States House Select Committee on Energy Independence and Global Warming (US)
- European Union climate and energy package (EU)
- Department of Energy and Climate Change (UK)
- White House Office of Energy and Climate Change Policy (US)
- Department of Climate Change, Energy, the Environment and Water (Australia)
- Minister for the Environment and Water (Australia)
- Climate Change and Sustainable Energy Act 2006
- Wuppertal Institute for Climate, Environment and Energy (Germany)
- Center for Climate and Energy Solutions (UK)
- Energy Security and Net Zero Select Committee (UK)
- San Diego Journal of Climate and Energy Law (US)
- Renewable Energy Sources and Climate Change Mitigation (United Nations)

== See also ==
- Environmental impact of the energy industry
- Sustainable energy
- Renewable energy
- Energy policy
- Energy industry
- Climate policy
- Water-energy nexus
- Water, energy and food security nexus
- Urbanization
