= White House Office of Domestic Climate Policy =

Position within the White House Office

White House National Climate Advisor
- Incumbent; Vacant since January 20, 2025
- Executive Branch of the U.S. Government; Executive Office of the President
- Appointer: The president
- Deputy: Vacant

The White House Office of Domestic Climate Policy (also known as the Climate Policy Office or CPO) was an office created in the Biden Administration within the White House Office. It was headed by the assistant to the president and national climate advisor (also known as the White House national climate advisor), which was the president's chief advisor on domestic climate change policy. The National Climate Advisor served as vice-chair of the National Climate Task Force.

The CPO coordinate climate and environment policy, which differed from:

- The office of the Senior Advisor for Clean Energy Innovation and Implementation, which led White House and government-wide Clean Energy Policy and the implementation of the Inflation Reduction Act and Bipartisan Infrastructure Law; and chaired the National Climate Task Force;
- The previously established U.S. Special Presidential Envoy for Climate (SPEC), who coordinated global climate policy; and
- The Council on Environmental Quality, which assesses environmental impacts within federal agencies.

== History ==
The Climate Policy Office has its roots in the White House Office of Energy and Climate Change Policy, which was established under the administration of Barack Obama in 2008 but was folded into the United States Domestic Policy Council in 2011 after Congress refused to fund the office. Carol Browner served as the only director of this office. No equivalent office was established under the administration of Donald Trump.

The position of the national climate advisor was established by President Joe Biden on January 20, 2021, and the Climate Policy Office was established on January 27. On December 14, 2020, it was announced that Gina McCarthy, the former administrator of the Environmental Protection Agency under President Barack Obama, would serve as the first national climate advisor, as well as chair of the National Climate Task Force. Ali Zaidi, served as the first deputy national climate advisor. and the second national climate advisor

However, the leadership of the National Climate Task Force was reshuffled in 2022 upon McCarthy's departure and the passage of the Inflation Reduction Act, with the Senior Advisor for Clean Energy Innovation and Implementation (head of all energy policy) becoming chair, while national climate advisor (coordinator of climate and environment policy) moved to vice-chair.

President Trump, by rescinding the establishing executive order, abolished the office of domestic climate policy.

== List of climate advisors ==
No.	Portrait	Officeholder	Term start	Term end	President	Notes
1		Carol Browner	January 22, 2009	March 3, 2011	Barack Obama	as Director of the Office of Energy and Climate Change Policy
Vacant (March 3, 2011 – January 20, 2021)
2		Gina McCarthy	January 20, 2021	September 16, 2022	Joe Biden	as White House National Climate Advisor
3		Ali Zaidi	September 16, 2022	January 20, 2025	Joe Biden	as White House National Climate Advisor
Vacant (January 20, 2025 – present)

== See also ==
- U.S. Special Presidential Envoy for Climate
- White House Office on Clean Energy Innovation and Implementation
- White House Office of Energy and Climate Change Policy, which existed under the Obama administration
