= Kristina Costa =

American political adviser

Kristina Costa is an American political advisor and climate mitigation leader. Costa was appointed a senior Biden White House executive, a State Department official advisor to John Kerry, and served as an advisor to Brian Deese in the Obama White House.

Costa led the White House's government-wide implementation of the $370 billion Inflation Reduction Act during the Biden Administration, the largest climate legislation in U.S. history, and widely regarded as one of the largest government-led infrastructure and energy investments in modern American history.

== Inflation Reduction Act implementation ==
Costa led the White House Office of Clean Energy Innovation and Implementation (OCEII), implementing all aspects of the Inflation Reduction Act (IRA), which is the largest climate and clean energy legislation in U.S. history.

The White House office she led (OCEII) was created in 2022 by Executive Order 14082. Her role overseeing the rollout of the IRA involved implementing tens of new U.S. tax credit programs, incentive programs, encompassing the most sweeping climate and energy policy in the U.S. to date.

Inflation Reduction Act bill breakdown:

Inflation Reduction Act Energy and Climate Components
IRA ELEMENTS	BILL AMOUNT ($USD)
Clean Electricity Tax Credits (Production Tax Credits, Investment Tax Credits, and Tech-Neutral Incentives)	$160 Billion
Pollution, Infrastructure, and Community Investments (Greenhouse Gas Reduction Fund, and Community Block Grants)	$41 Billion
Consumer Energy Incentives (Rooftop solar, battery, heatpump, and appliance credits)	$36 Billion
Clean Manufacturing Tax Credits	$36 Billion
Clean Fuel and Vehicle Tax Credits	$36 Billion
Conservation, Rural Development, and Forestry	$34 Billion
Building Efficiency, Grid, and Industrial Grants	$27 Billion

Aspects of the law have been rolled back by the Trump Administration, and the policy evolution has been tracked closely by energy, infrastructure, and climate organizations.
