= Ali Zaidi (lawyer) =

American lawyer and political advisor

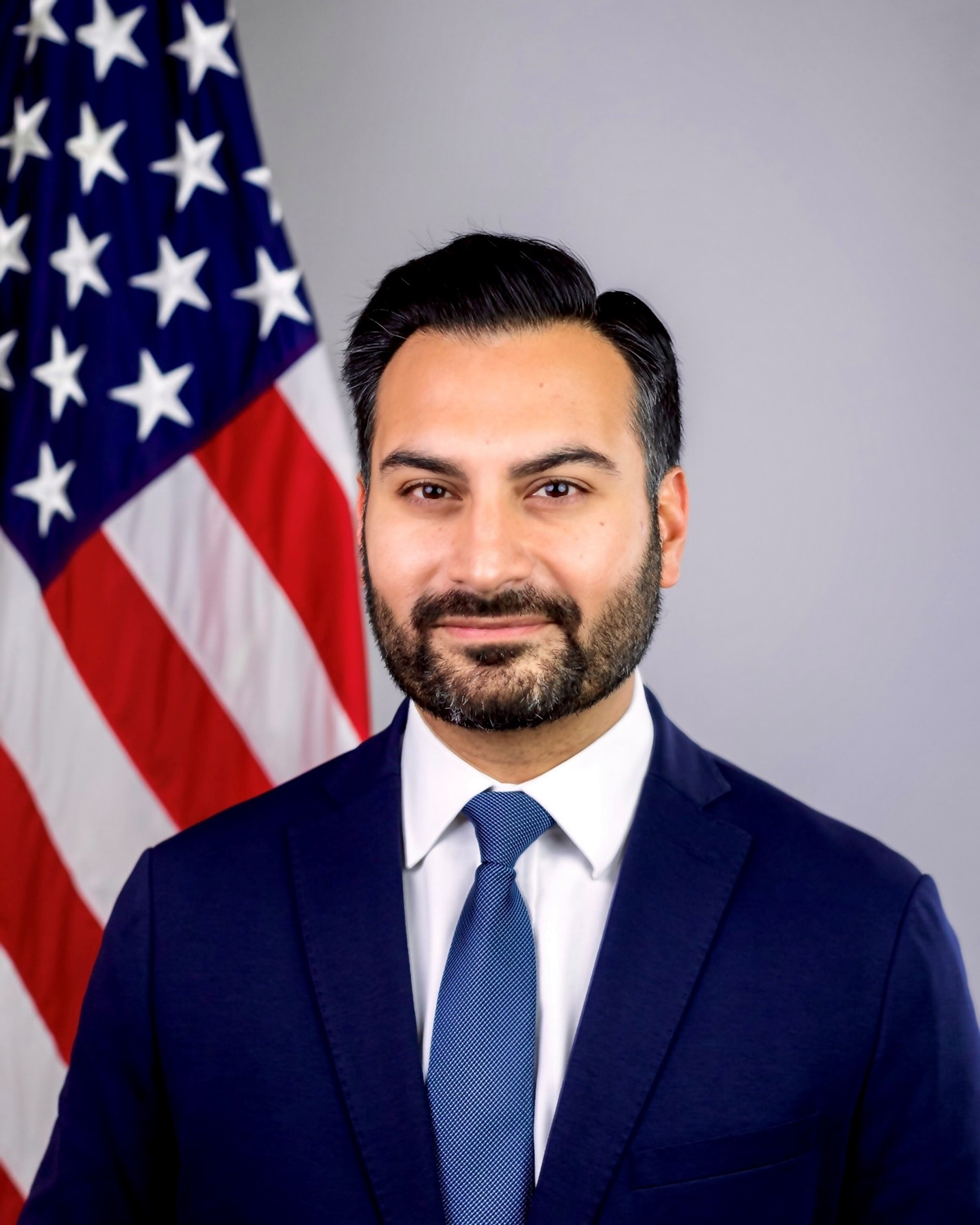

White House National Climate Advisor
- In office September 16, 2022 – January 20, 2025
- President: Joe Biden
- Preceded by: Gina McCarthy
- Succeeded by: TBD

Personal details
- Born: 1987 or 1988 (age 37–38) Pakistan
- Party: Democratic
- Education: Harvard University (BA); Georgetown University (JD)

Ali A. Zaidi (born 1987/1988) is a Pakistani-American lawyer who served as the second Biden White House national climate advisor from 2022 to 2025.

He was the New York deputy secretary for energy and environment. Zaidi held junior climate policy positions in the Obama administration including United States Domestic Policy Council deputy director for energy policy and associate director for natural resources, energy, and science at the Office of Management and Budget. Zaidi was an aide to U.S. energy secretary Steven Chu. He served as the first White House deputy national climate advisor from 2021 to 2022.

== Early life and education ==
Zaidi was born in Pakistan and moved to Edinboro, Pennsylvania, with his family in 1993. He graduated from General McLane High School in 2004.

Zaidi completed a Bachelor of Arts degree from Harvard College and a Juris Doctor from the Georgetown University Law Center. He was an editor of The Georgetown Law Journal.

== Career ==
=== Obama administration ===
Beginning in February 2009, Zaidi served for eight years in a number of roles within the Obama administration, including the White House Domestic Policy Council’s (DPC) deputy director for energy policy and policy aide to U.S. energy secretary Steven Chu and as special projects coordinator at the U.S. Office of Management and Budget (OMB).

As the DPC deputy director for energy policy his portfolio covered policy matters related to supply of and demand for energy - including policies that reduce U.S. dependence on foreign oil by promoting responsible federal-lands production and adoption of alternative fuels; and policies that create jobs by advancing research and deployment of clean energy and energy efficiency technologies - as well as the intersection of these matters with the President's Climate Action Plan.

Zaidi was associate director for natural resources, energy, and science at the Office of Management and Budget. Zaidi supported development and execution of the President's economic and environmental policy, and led a team of experts overseeing a wide array of policy, budget, and management issues – including issues related to energy, agriculture, infrastructure, conservation, and technology – across a nearly $100 billion portfolio. In this role, Zaidi also served as OMB's chief policy official for implementation of the President's Climate Action Plan, which he helped design and draft.

=== Private sector ===
In February 2017, Zaidi joined the law firm Morrison & Foerster as a senior advisor in their Washington, D.C., office. He was a Precourt Scholar and adjunct professor at Stanford University before joining the Biden administration. Zaidi was the New York deputy secretary for energy and environment, where he worked with the governor of New York on climate policy and finance.

=== Biden administration ===
Zaidi explains the climate change-related executive orders signed by Joe Biden in January 2021.

Zaidi began in the administration as Deputy White House National Climate Advisor, where he served under Gina McCarthy. The White House announced that Zaidi would succeed McCarthy as the White House National Climate Advisor following her resignation on September 16, 2022.

In December 2020, The Economic Times noted that Zaidi is the highest-ranking Pakistani-American in the Biden administration.

In 2021, he was an honoree of the Carnegie Corporation of New York's Great Immigrant Award.
