= John Podesta =

American political consultant (born 1949)

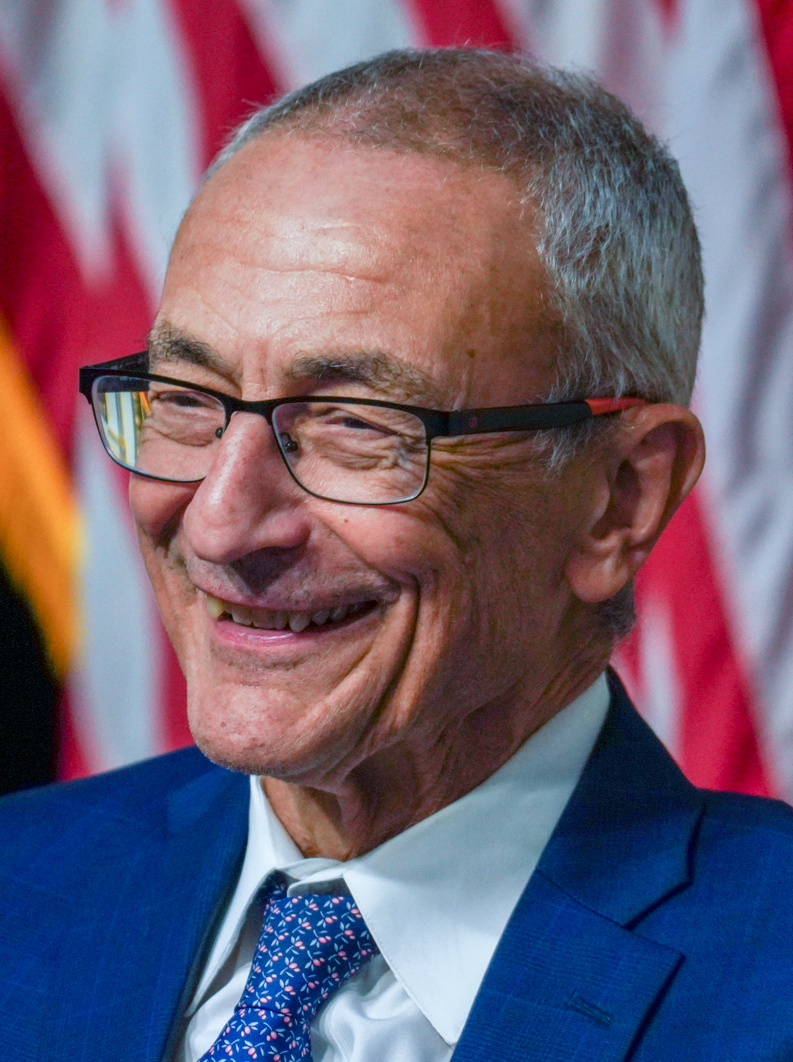
- Podesta in 2024

20th White House Chief of Staff
- In office October 20, 1998 – January 20, 2001
- President: Bill Clinton
- Deputy: Steve Ricchetti; Maria Echaveste
- Preceded by: Erskine Bowles
- Succeeded by: Andy Card

Senior Advisor to the President for International Climate Policy
- In office March 6, 2024 – January 20, 2025 Serving with Steve Benjamin, Tom Perez, Annie Tomasini, Karine Jean-Pierre and Ben LaBolt
- President: Joe Biden
- Preceded by: John Kerry (U.S. Special Presidential Envoy for Climate)

Senior Advisor to the President for Clean Energy Innovation and Implementation
- In office September 2, 2022 – January 20, 2025 Serving with Steve Benjamin, Tom Perez, Annie Tomasini, Karine Jean-Pierre and Ben LaBolt and Mike Donilon, Anita Dunn, Gene Sperling, Mitch Landrieu, Neera Tanden, Julie Rodriguez and Keisha Lance Bottoms
- President: Joe Biden
- Deputy: Kristina Costa
- Preceded by: Office established

Counselor to the President
- In office January 1, 2014 – February 13, 2015
- President: Barack Obama
- Preceded by: Pete Rouse
- Succeeded by: Kellyanne Conway

White House Deputy Chief of Staff for Operations
- In office January 20, 1997 – October 20, 1998
- President: Bill Clinton
- Preceded by: Evelyn Lieberman
- Succeeded by: Steve Ricchetti

White House Staff Secretary
- In office January 20, 1993 – June 30, 1995
- President: Bill Clinton
- Preceded by: Phillip Brady
- Succeeded by: Todd Stern

Personal details
- Born: John David Podesta Jr. January 8, 1949 (age 77) Chicago, Illinois, U.S.
- Party: Democratic
- Spouse: Mary Podesta (m. 1978)
- Children: 3
- Relatives: Tony Podesta (brother)
- Education: Knox College (BA); Georgetown University (JD)

John David Podesta Jr. (born January 8, 1949) is an American political consultant who served as the 20th White House chief of staff to President Bill Clinton from 1998 to 2001. He also served as Senior Advisor to the President for International Climate Policy from 2024 to 2025, senior Advisor to the President for Clean Energy Innovation and Implementation from 2022 to 2025, and counselor to President Barack Obama from 2014 to 2015. During the Clinton administration, he also served as White House staff secretary from 1993 to 1995 and White House deputy chief of staff for operations from 1997 to 1998.

Podesta is the former president and now chair and counselor of the Center for American Progress (CAP), a think tank in Washington, D.C., as well as a visiting professor of law at Georgetown University Law Center and was chairman of Hillary Clinton's 2016 presidential campaign. Additionally, he was a co-chairman of the Obama transition team. In his role as senior advisor to President Joe Biden, Podesta oversaw the disbursement of $370–783 billion in clean energy tax credits and incentives authorized by the Inflation Reduction Act of 2022. On January 31, 2024, it was announced that Podesta would succeed John Kerry as top U.S. climate diplomat.

== Early life ==
Podesta spent most of his early years in Chicago, where he was born, growing up in the neighborhood of Jefferson Park on the city's Northwest Side. His mother, Mary (née Kokoris), was Greek-American, and his father, John David Podesta Sr., was Italian-American. Tony Podesta, a lobbyist, is his brother. Podesta's father did not graduate from high school, but encouraged his children to attend college.

In 1967, Podesta graduated from Lane Tech High School in Chicago. Podesta met Bill Clinton in 1970 when they worked in Connecticut for Joseph Duffey, a candidate for the United States Senate. In 1971, he graduated from Knox College in Galesburg, Illinois, where he had served as a volunteer for the presidential candidacy of Eugene McCarthy. He received his J.D. from Georgetown University Law Center in 1976.

Podesta worked as a trial attorney for the Department of Justice's Honors Program in the Land and Natural Resources Division (1976–77), and as a Special Assistant to the Director of ACTION, the Federal volunteer agency (1978–79). His political career began in 1972, when he worked for George McGovern's unsuccessful presidential campaign.

== Career ==
Podesta held positions on Capitol Hill, including Counselor to Democratic Leader Senator Thomas Daschle (1995–96); Chief Counsel for the Senate Agriculture Committee (1987–88); Chief Minority Counsel for the United States Senate Judiciary Subcommittee on Patents, Copyrights, and Trademarks; Security and Terrorism; and Regulatory Reform; and Counsel on the Majority Staff of the Senate Judiciary Committee (1979–81). In 1988, he and his brother Tony co-founded Podesta Associates, Inc., a Washington, D.C., "government relations and public affairs" lobbying firm. Now known as the Podesta Group, the firm "has close ties to the Democratic Party and the Obama administration [and] has been retained by some of the biggest corporations in the country, including Wal-Mart, BP and Lockheed Martin."

=== Clinton administration ===
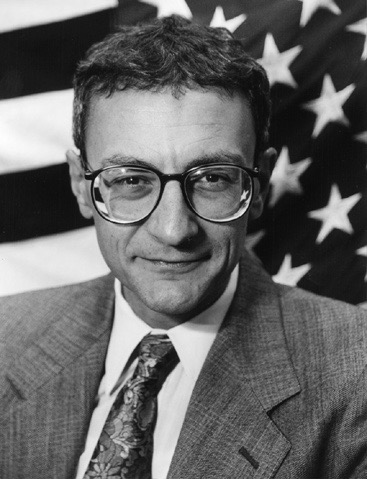
Podesta in 1993

Podesta served as both an assistant to the president and as deputy chief of staff. Earlier, from January 1993 to 1995, he was assistant to the president, staff secretary and a senior policy adviser on government information, privacy, telecommunications security and regulatory policy. Podesta was the first White House staffer to get the news of the Lewinsky scandal and was put in charge of managing the crisis. In 1998, he became President Clinton's chief of staff in the second Clinton administration and served in the position until the end of Clinton's time in office in January 2001. Podesta encouraged Executive Order 12958, which led to efforts to declassify millions of pages from the U.S. diplomatic and national security history.

=== Post-Clinton administration ===
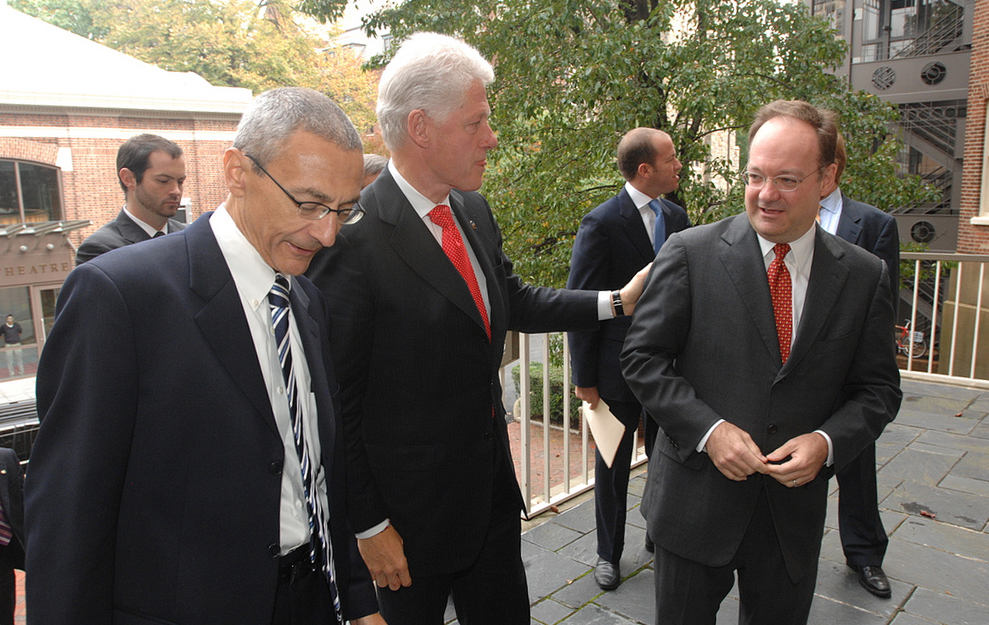
Podesta meeting with Bill Clinton and Georgetown University president John J. DeGioia in 2006

In 2003, Podesta founded the Center for American Progress, a liberal think tank in Washington, D.C., and served as its president and CEO until he stepped down in 2011. (CAP chief operating officer Neera Tanden succeeded Podesta as president and CEO, taking over day-to-day operations.) Podesta remained chairman of the nonexecutive board of directors for a time, and remains on the board as of August 2020, although not as chairman.

Podesta has taught at his alma mater, Georgetown University Law Center, many times over the years, teaching classes on congressional investigations, law and technology, legislation, copyright and public-interest law. On the Georgetown faculty, Podesta's title is Distinguished Visitor from Practice. From 2002 to 2014, Podesta served as a member of the Constitution Project's bipartisan Liberty and Security Committee. In 2008, he authored The Power of Progress: How America's Progressives Can (Once Again) Save Our Economy, Our Climate, and Our Country. In 2009, he accompanied Bill Clinton to North Korea for negotiations securing the release of two American journalists imprisoned on espionage charges. He can be seen in numerous widely circulated photographs of Clinton meeting with Kim Jong-il.

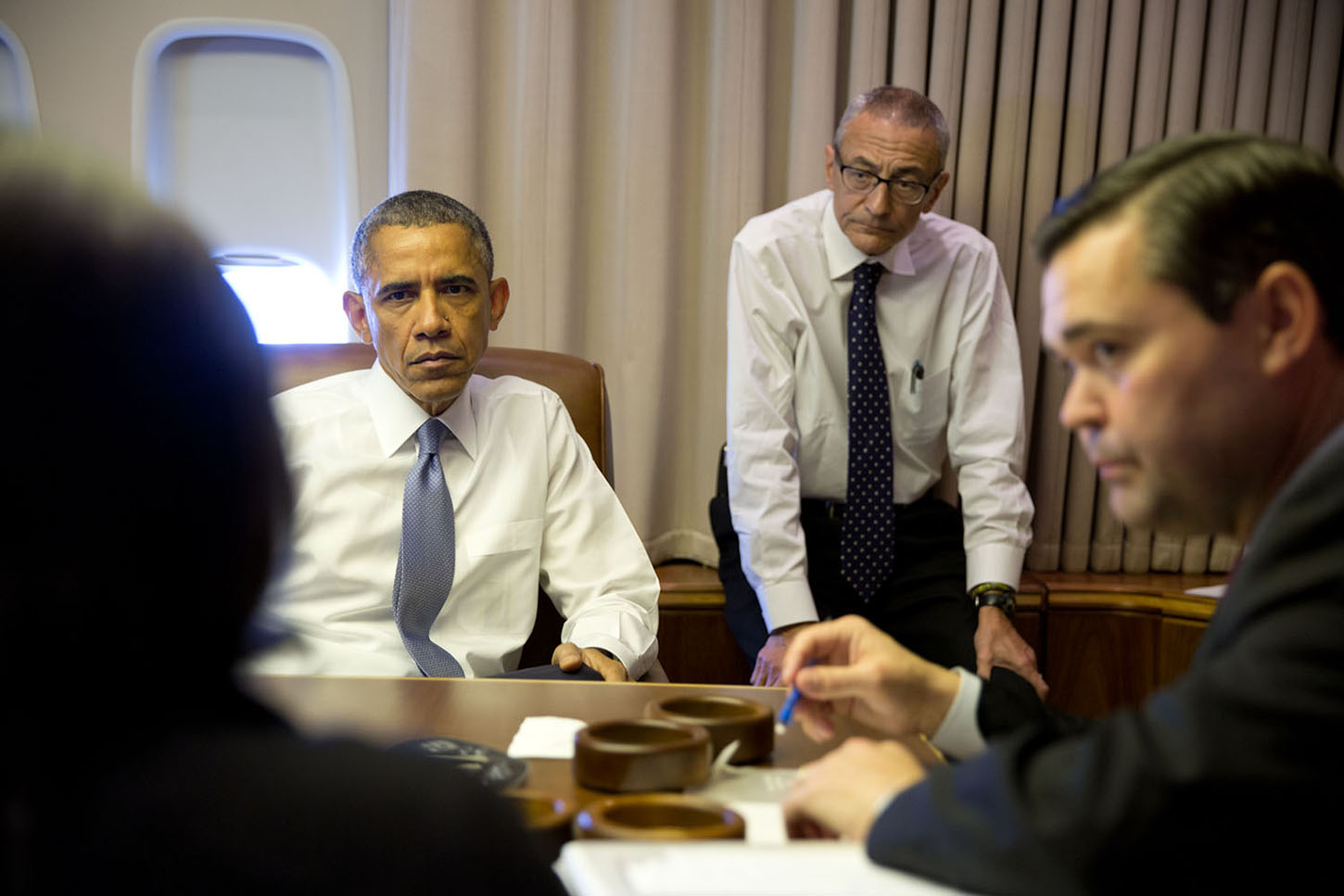
President Obama holds a meeting with Podesta and Susan Rice aboard Air Force One, 2015

Podesta opposes the excessive use of classification, and in a 2004 speech at Princeton University condemned what he called the U.S.'s "excessive government secrecy" and "bloated secrecy bureaucracy". Podesta has called Executive Order 12958, "which set tough standards for classifying documents and led to the unprecedented effort to declassify millions of pages from our nation's diplomatic and national security history," as "perhaps the biggest accomplishment of the Clinton administration." More than 800 million pages of intelligence documents were declassified as part of the program.

Podesta is described as "a longtime advocate for government disclosure of UFO files". He has supported petitions by some who believe UFOs are alien spacecraft to the government to release files related to the subject. At a 2002 news conference organized by Coalition for Freedom of Information Podesta stated that, "It is time for the government to declassify records that are more than 25 years old and to provide scientists with data that will assist in determining the real nature of this phenomenon." Podesta wrote the foreword for a book by Leslie Kean titled "UFOs- Generals, Pilots, and Government Officials Go On The Record". The book details numerous contact events by these trained personnel.

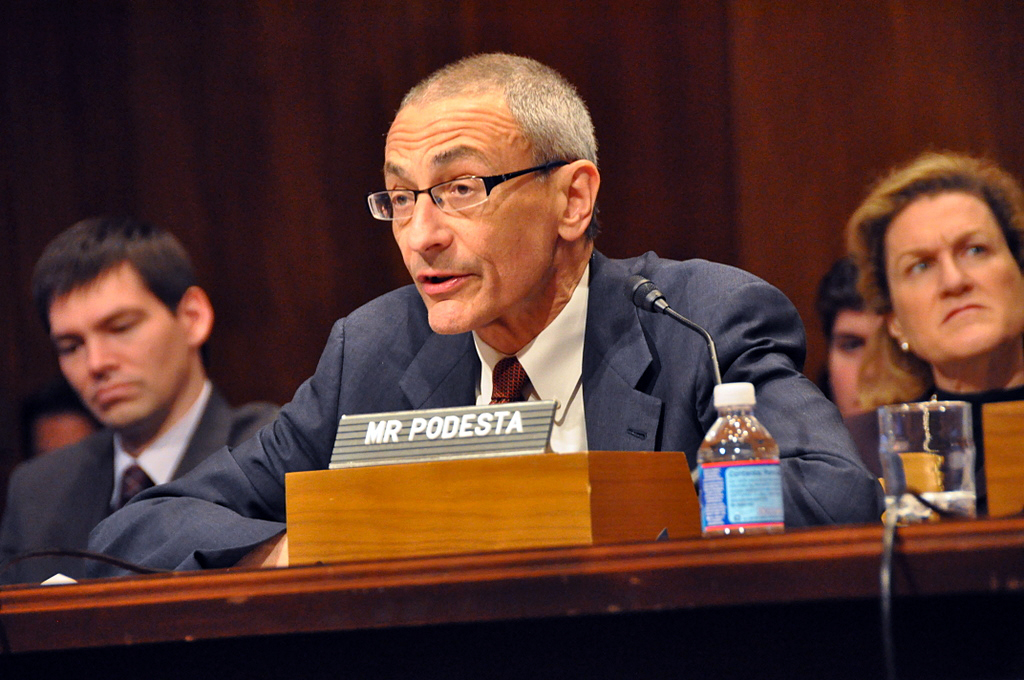
Podesta testifies before the Senate Budget Committee Task Force on Government Performance.

Podesta became an honorary patron of the University Philosophical Society in March 2006. Podesta is an emeritus member of the Knox College Board of Trustees. Podesta has served on the board of directors of Bedford, Massachusetts–based energy company Joule Unlimited since January 2011. He has also served on the board of the Portland, Oregon-based Equilibrium Capital. In 2013, Podesta earned $90,000 as a consultant to the West Chester, Pennsylvania-based HJW Foundation, a nonprofit group led by Swiss billionaire Hansjörg Wyss. He was the U.S. representative to the UN High-Level Panel on the Post-2015 Development Agenda.

After the 2016 election, Podesta joined The Washington Post as a columnist. Podesta also sits on the steering committee of the China–United States Exchange Foundation. On September 2, 2022, President Joe Biden appointed Podesta as senior advisor to the president for clean energy innovation and implementation, heading his own new dedicated White House office. For nearly two years in this role, Podesta oversaw the $370–783 billion climate investment authorized by the Inflation Reduction Act of 2022, which was passed the previous month. He left to succeed John Kerry in the role of U.S. Special Presidential Envoy for Climate in 2024.

The White House Office on Clean Energy Innovation and Implementation was abolished by President Trump by his "Unleashing American Energy" executive order on January 20th, 2025.

== Personal email leak ==
On October 7, 2016, WikiLeaks started to publish thousands of emails reportedly retrieved from Podesta's private Gmail account, some of which contained controversial material regarding Clinton's positions or campaign strategy. Podesta and the Clinton campaign did not confirm or deny the authenticity of the emails. Experts investigating the leak, including a private security firm called Secureworks, claimed that a Russian hacking group named Fancy Bear gained access to Podesta's account through phishing. Podesta said that Russian intelligence officials attempting to influence the presidential election in favor of Donald Trump were behind the leak.

The United States Intelligence Community released a statement directly accusing Russian intelligence of involvement. Vice President Joe Biden told NBC News that the United States was "sending a message" to Russian President Vladimir Putin and that a wide-ranging "clandestine" cyber operation would take place in response to the Russians' activities. When asked about the leaks, Putin replied that claims of Russian involvement were false. "The hysteria is merely caused by the fact that somebody needs to divert the attention of the American people from the essence of what was exposed by the hackers."

== Personal life ==
Podesta is Catholic and has worked with Catholics in Alliance for the Common Good and Catholics United. He and his wife Mary Podesta, a Washington, D.C., attorney, married in 1978 and have three children. His daughter, Megan Rouse, was the president of the Dublin Unified School District (CA) Board of Trustees. Podesta is an avid cook.

== See also ==
- Podesta Group
- Timeline of Russian interference in the 2016 United States elections (July 2016 – election day)

Political offices
Preceded by Phillip Brady	White House Staff Secretary; January 20, 1993 – June 30, 1995	Succeeded by Todd Stern
Preceded by Steve Ricchetti	White House Deputy Chief of Staff for Operations; January 20, 1997 – October 20, 1998	Succeeded by Evelyn Lieberman
Preceded by Erskine Bowles	White House Chief of Staff; October 20, 1998 – January 20, 2001	Succeeded by Andy Card
Preceded by Pete Rouse	Counselor to the President; January 1, 2014 – February 13, 2015	Succeeded by Steve Bannon, Kellyanne Conway, Dina Powell
Preceded by Jared Kushner, Stephen Miller, Kevin Hassett, Eric Herschmann	Senior Advisor to the President for Clean Energy Innovation and Implementation; September 2, 2022 – January 20, 2025; Served alongside: Mike Donilon, Anita Dunn, Gene Sperling, Neera Tanden, Mitch Landrieu, Julie Chávez Rodriguez, Keisha Lance Bottoms	Vacant Title next held by Elon Musk, Massad Boulos
Non-profit organization positions
New office	President of the Center for American Progress; October 24, 2003 – November 1, 2011	Succeeded by Neera Tanden
