= White House Office on Clean Energy Innovation and Implementation =

Clean energy initiative

The White House Office on Clean Energy Innovation and Implementation (OCEII) was an office within the White House Office that was part of the Executive Office of the President of the United States. It was established on September 12, 2022, by Joe Biden via executive order in order to coordinate the policymaking process with respect to implementing the energy and infrastructure provisions of the Inflation Reduction Act.

== OCEII Leadership ==
Biden selected John Podesta as Senior Advisor for Clean Energy Innovation and Implementation, which heads the office and reports directly to the President. In addition, the senior advisor for clean energy innovation and implementation chairs the National Climate Task Force, serving as the White House and Administration's top climate official, or "climate czar."

When Podesta shifted to take John Kerry's international-focused "climate envoy" role, Podesta's Deputy, Kristina Costa, led the OCEII for the remainder of the Biden Administration.

== Trump Office Removal ==
The OCEII office was abolished by President Trump via the “Unleashing American Energy” executive order on January 20, 2025.
