= Gina McCarthy =

American government official (born 1954)

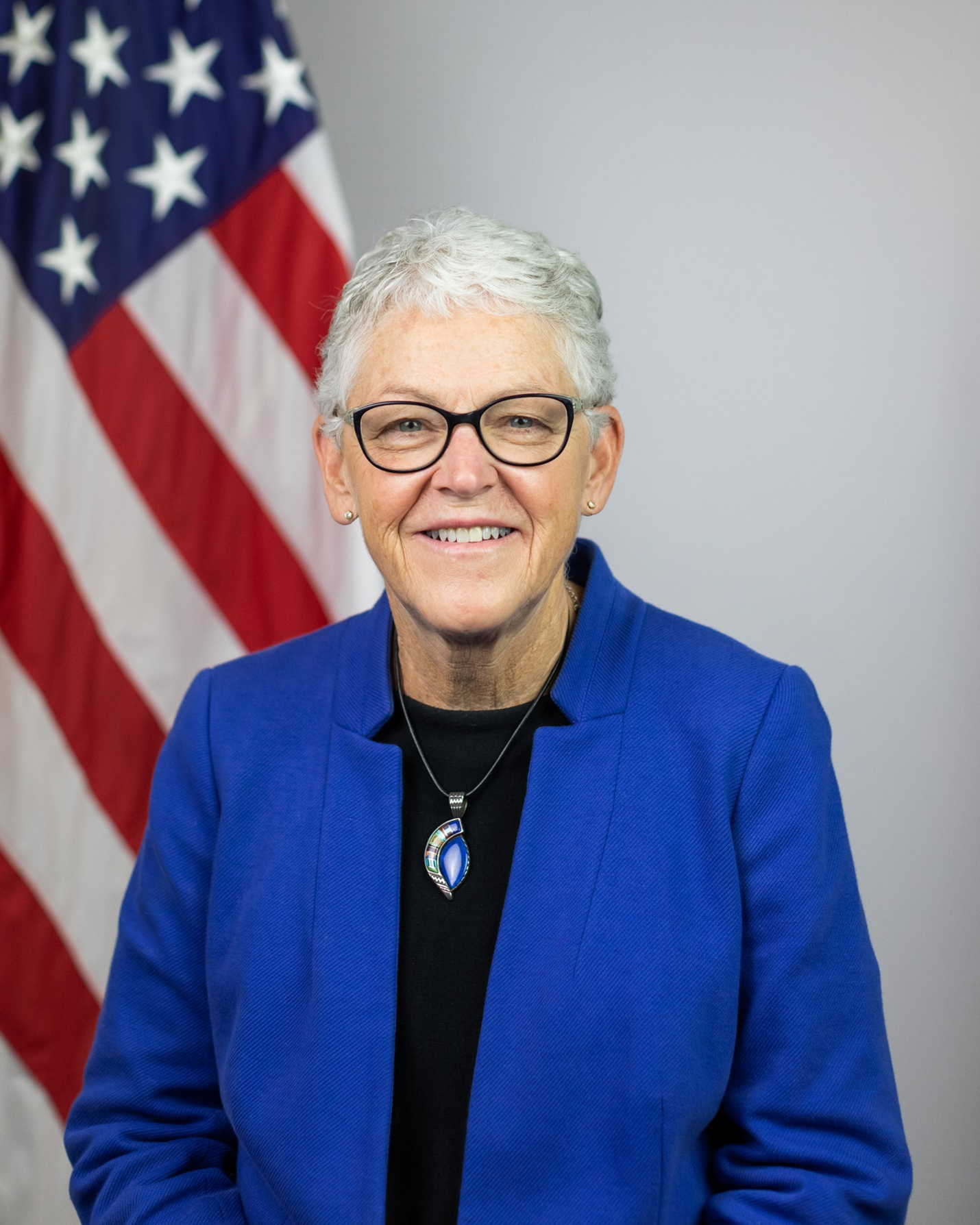
- Official portrait, 2022

1st White House National Climate Advisor
- In office January 20, 2021 – September 16, 2022
- President: Joe Biden
- Deputy: Ali Zaidi
- Preceded by: Position established
- Succeeded by: Ali Zaidi

13th Administrator of the Environmental Protection Agency
- In office July 18, 2013 – January 20, 2017
- President: Barack Obama
- Deputy: Bob Perciasepe
- Preceded by: Bob Perciasepe (acting)
- Succeeded by: Scott Pruitt

Assistant Administrator of the Environmental Protection Agency for Air and Radiation
- In office June 2, 2009 – July 18, 2013
- President: Barack Obama
- Preceded by: Jeffrey Holmstead
- Succeeded by: William Wehrum

Commissioner of the Connecticut Department of Environmental Protection
- In office November 10, 2004 – June 2, 2009
- Governor: Jodi Rell
- Preceded by: Arthur J. Rocque
- Succeeded by: Amey Marella

Personal details
- Born: Regina McCarthy; May 3, 1954 (age 72) Boston, Massachusetts, U.S.
- Party: Democratic
- Children: 3
- Education: University of Massachusetts Boston (BA); Tufts University (MS)
- Gina McCarthy's voice Speaking on Rachel Carson; First published December 12, 2014

Regina McCarthy (born May 3, 1954) is an American air quality expert who served as the first White House national climate advisor from 2021 to 2022. She previously served as the thirteenth administrator of the Environmental Protection Agency from 2013 to 2017.

A Massachusetts native, McCarthy holds degrees from the University of Massachusetts Boston and Tufts University. She was a civil servant in the Massachusetts state government, holding various environmental roles and serving as an environmental advisor to the Governor of Massachusetts. She served as commissioner of the Connecticut Department of Environmental Protection from 2004 to 2009 before joining the EPA in 2009.

On March 4, 2013, President Barack Obama nominated McCarthy to replace Lisa Jackson as EPA administrator. Confirmation hearings started on April 11, 2013. On July 18, 2013, she was confirmed after a record 136-day confirmation process, becoming the face of Obama's global warming and climate change initiative.

In early 2020, McCarthy became president and CEO of the Natural Resources Defense Council (NRDC).

On December 18, 2020, President-elect Joe Biden announced that he would appoint McCarthy as the first White House national climate advisor, where she would advise Biden on domestic climate change policy and lead the White House Office of Domestic Climate Policy. As a presidential appointee, she joined his administration on January 20, 2021. McCarthy stepped down from her role on September 16, 2022.

== Early life and education ==
Born in Brighton, Boston, on May 3, 1954, McCarthy was raised in Dorchester and Canton, Massachusetts. She has Irish ancestry, and grew up in a working-class family. She graduated from the University of Massachusetts Boston in 1976 with a Bachelor of Arts degree in Social Anthropology. She later attended Tufts University, where she received a Master of Science combining Environmental Health Engineering with Planning and Policy in 1981.

== Early career ==
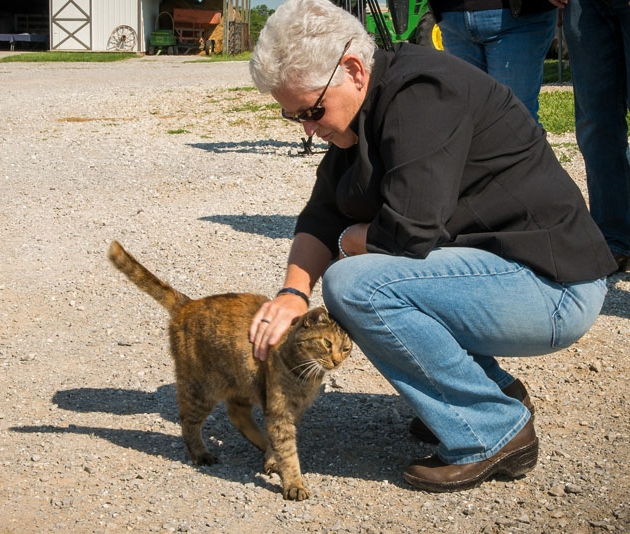
McCarthy visiting a Missouri farm in 2014

McCarthy started her health and environment career in 1980, serving as the city of Canton's health agent. In 1985, Governor Dukakis tapped her to serve on a state hazardous waste safety council. She held several top positions in the civil service of the Commonwealth of Massachusetts, including undersecretary for policy for Massachusetts Executive Office of Environmental Affairs from 1999 to 2003 and Deputy Secretary of the Massachusetts Office of Commonwealth Development from 2003 to 2004.

McCarthy has worked on environmental issues at the state and local levels and has developed policies on economic growth, energy, transportation and the environment. She has served as environmental adviser to five Massachusetts governors, including former governor Mitt Romney.

On November 10, 2004, Connecticut governor Jodi Rell appointed McCarthy as commissioner of the Connecticut Department of Environmental Protection. In that role she developed and implemented the first regional policy to trade carbon credits to reduce greenhouse gas emissions from power plants. She stepped down in 2009 to join the Obama administration.

On March 16, 2009, President Barack Obama nominated McCarthy to serve as assistant administrator for the EPA's Office of Air and Radiation. She was confirmed by the Senate on June 2, 2009, and served until her confirmation as EPA administrator in 2013.

== EPA administrator ==
=== Nomination ===
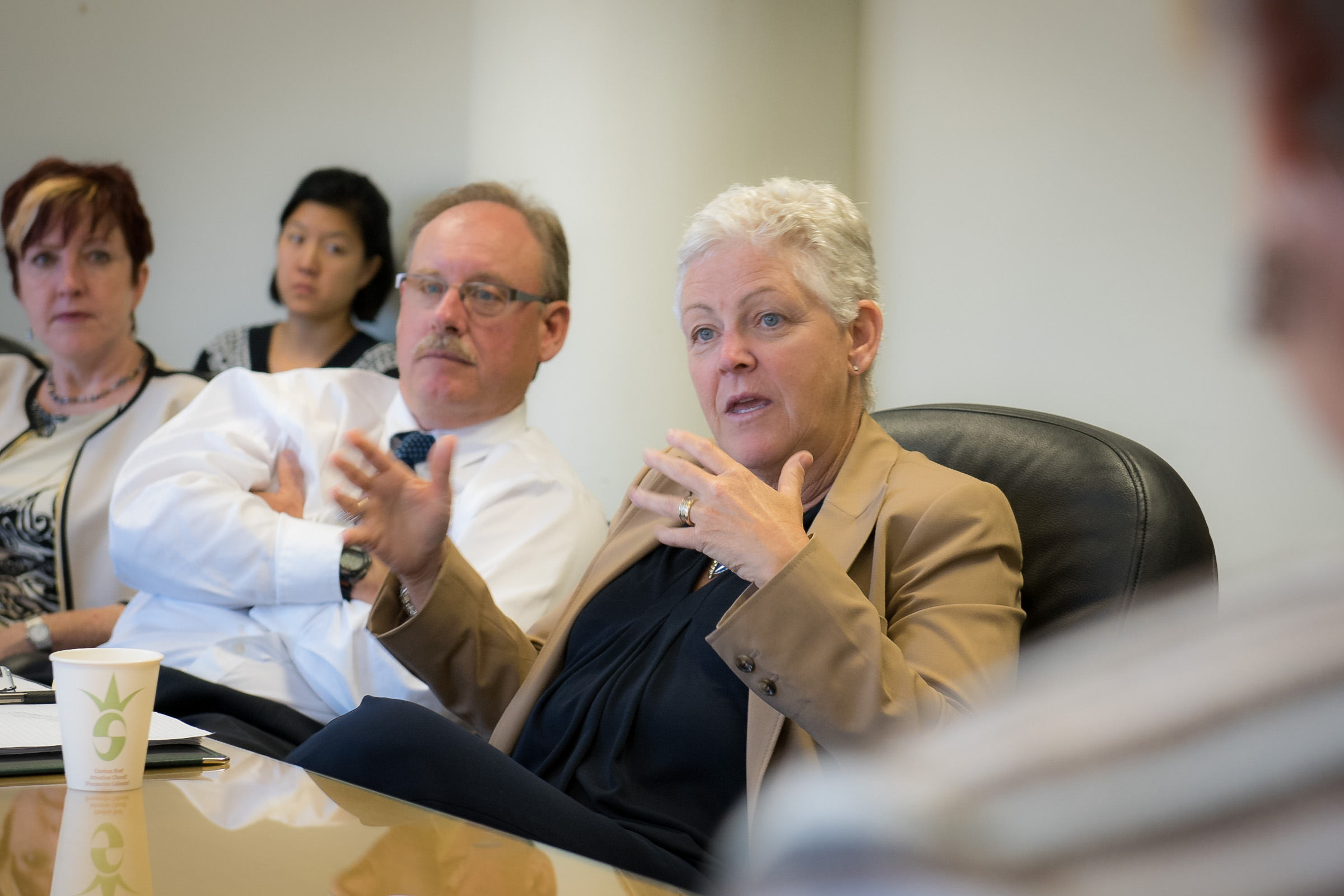
McCarthy at 2014 meeting

On March 4, 2013, Obama nominated McCarthy to replace Lisa Jackson as EPA administrator. According to some observers, Obama's selection of McCarthy confirmed his seriousness about battling climate change. Daniel Fiorino, director of the Center for Environmental Policy at American University, said: "Her nomination signals that the president really wants to deliver on his State of the Union objectives to take serious action on climate change."

Regarding speculation that her appointment would affect Obama's decision on the Keystone XL Pipeline, Fiorino stated that this wouldn't affect the dynamics of the Keystone decision significantly as other considerations are paramount, but added, "She knows air and climate issues very well and she's a very strong environmentalist." The EPA is one of the federal agencies that advised the Obama administration on the proposed pipeline.

=== Confirmation ===
Confirmation hearings started April 11, 2013.

After the Senate Committee on Environment and Public Works approved McCarthy's nomination in a vote along party lines on May 16, the nomination was stalled for a month on the Senate floor by John Barrasso of Wyoming.

In the interim, Bob Perciasepe served as the EPA's acting administrator. David Vitter, the ranking Republican on the committee, posed 600 of a total 1,100 questions to McCarthy. The committee Republicans demanded responses from McCarthy on five "transparency requests."

The delayed nomination resulted in the longest period that the agency was without a leader. Christine Todd Whitman, a former Republican governor of New Jersey and EPA administrator under President George W. Bush, stated: "It's not about [McCarthy], it's about the agency... Republicans lost the [presidential] election and they have to realize that this is the president's choice of nominee. They can go after the president, but Gina McCarthy should get an up-and-down vote." On July 18, 2013, the Senate confirmed McCarthy as the thirteenth Administrator of the Environmental Protection Agency by a vote of 59–40, largely along party lines.

On September 11, 2015, twenty-six U.S. representatives introduced a resolution impeaching McCarthy. It was referred to the House Judiciary Committee and died there.

=== Tenure ===
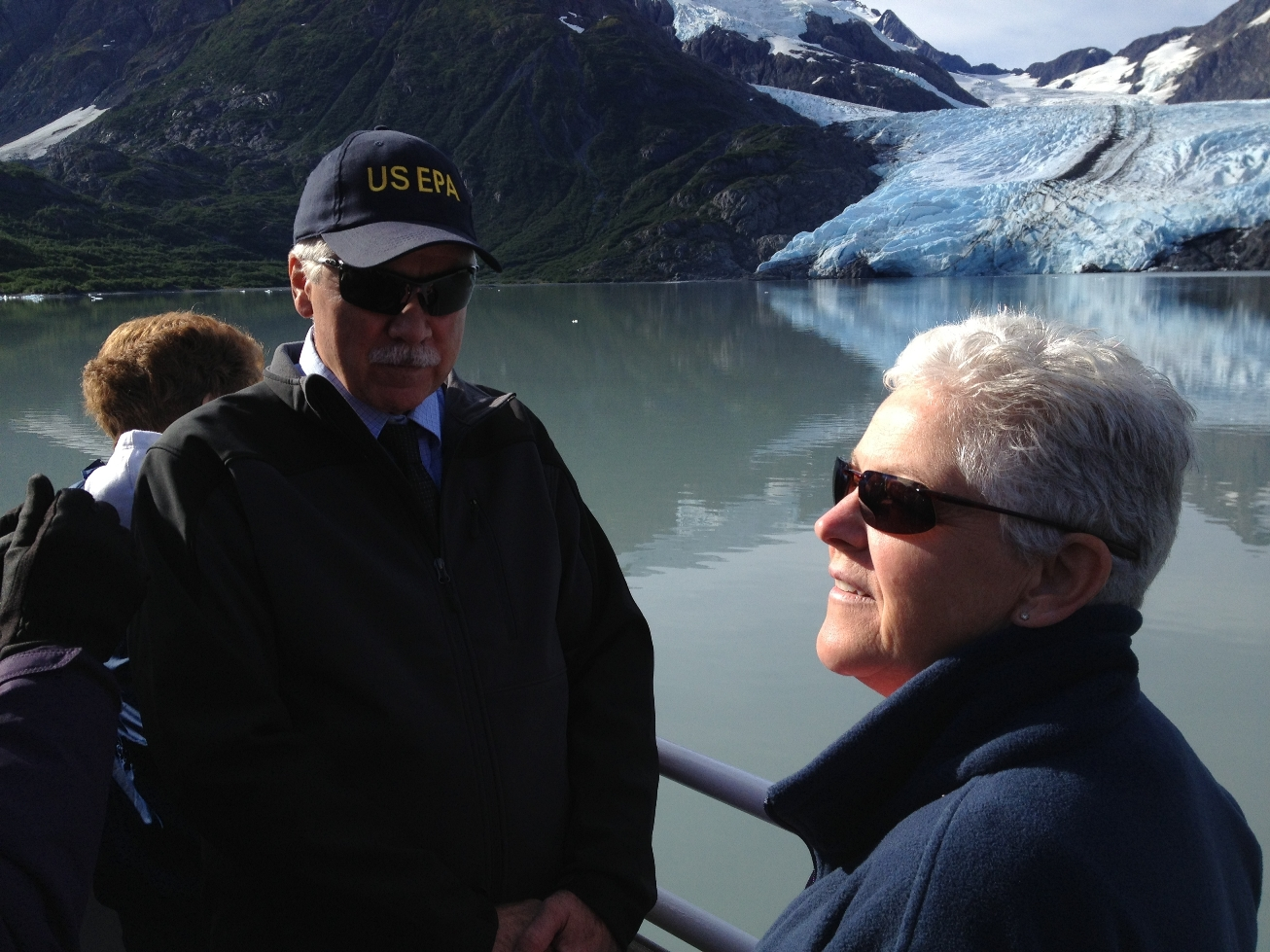
Administrator Gina McCarthy at Portage Lake Glacier, Alaska, August 26, 2013

On May 27, 2015, McCarthy finalized a rule under the Clean Water Act which proposed a new detailed and inclusive definition of "waters of the United States". Thirteen states sued, and U.S. chief district judge Ralph R. Erickson issued an injunction blocking the regulation in those states.

In a separate lawsuit, on October 9, United States Court of Appeals for the Sixth Circuit Judge David McKeague, joined by Judge Richard Allen Griffin stayed the rule's application nationwide; judge Damon Keith dissented. Congress passed a joint resolution under the Congressional Review Act overturning the "WOTUS" rule, but President Obama vetoed the measure.

On June 25, 2015, McCarthy finalized the Clean Power Plan under the Clean Air Act, seeking to reduce coal use pursuant to the Paris Agreement. Challengers failed to get the regulation stayed by the United States Court of Appeals for the District of Columbia, but on February 9, 2016, the Supreme Court of the United States voted 5–4 to grant the stay, the first time the Supreme Court had ever stayed a regulation prior to lower court review.

On March 17, 2016, McCarthy and Michigan Governor Rick Snyder testified before the United States House Committee on Oversight and Government Reform regarding the Flint water crisis. Snyder apologized for the state's mistakes. McCarthy, however, insisted the EPA had done nothing wrong and that "there is no way my agency created this problem"; she was at times shouted down by outraged members of Congress. In October 2016, the EPA's inspector general concluded that the EPA had wrongfully delayed issuing an emergency order regarding Flint.

== Employment outside government ==
In 2017, McCarthy joined Pegasus Capital Advisors, a private equity firm, where she serves as an operating advisor focused on sustainability and wellness investments.

In late May 2018, Harvard T.H. Chan School of Public Health announced the formation of the Center for Climate, Health, and the Global Environment with McCarthy as its director. In January 2020, she was named chair of its board of advisors.

McCarthy was also a Richard L. and Ronay A. Menschel Senior Leadership Fellow at the School of Public Health. She taught a course there in the Department of Environmental Health titled, "Environmental Leadership: Integrating Science, Public Policy, and Political Rhetoric". She was the School's 2017 Commencement speaker. On November 6, 2017, she was appointed Professor of Public Health Practice.

In November 2019, McCarthy was appointed president and CEO of the Natural Resources Defense Council, effective early 2020.

McCarthy explains why climate change is intersectional in the Biden administration.

== Biden administration ==
On December 18, 2020, President-elect Biden presented McCarthy as his choice to become the first White House national climate advisor, head of the White House Office of Climate Policy. McCarthy serves as Biden's chief advisor on domestic climate change policy. The position, which will had its own staff, was a part of the White House Office. McCarthy said she was initially reluctant to join the administration until Biden adopted a broad view of climate change. She said that when Biden as a candidate for president "made the connection between climate and health and environmental and racial justice, and he framed it in terms of what needed to be done after the pandemic for job growth" she was persuaded and "energized".

In June 2022, McCarthy urged tech companies to censor the spread of misinformation regarding climate change, saying "The tech companies have to stop allowing specific individuals over and over again to spread disinformation," and "We need the tech companies to really jump in."

On September 2, 2022, the White House announced that McCarthy would step down as Biden's top climate advisor on September 16 and be replaced by Ali Zaidi.

== Personal life ==
McCarthy is married to Kenneth McCarey. During her stint at the EPA, her husband lived in Massachusetts, but would often join her for several weeks at a time in Washington. They have three adult children. She is a fan of the Barefoot Contessa cooking show.

Political offices
Preceded by Lisa Jackson	Administrator of the Environmental Protection Agency; 2013–2017	Succeeded by Scott Pruitt
New creation	White House National Climate Advisor; 2021–2022	Succeeded by Ali Zaidi
