= U.S. Special Presidential Envoy for Climate =

Position in the American executive branch

Special Presidential Envoy for Climate of the United States
- Incumbent; Vacant since January 20, 2025
- United States Department of State
- Type: Special Presidential Envoy
- Status: Not confirmed
- Member of: United States National Security Council (NSC)
- Reports to: President of the United States
- Appointer: President of the United States
- Term length: At the pleasure of the president
- Inaugural holder: John Kerry
- Formation: January 20, 2021
- Website: Official website

The United States special presidential envoy for climate (SPEC) was a position within the U.S. Department of State responsible for "leading US diplomacy to address the climate crisis" during Joe Biden's presidency. The special envoy was a member of the principals committee of the National Security Council, reporting directly to the president.

In April 2025, under Donald Trump's second presidency, U.S. secretary of state Marco Rubio announced that the position had been abolished.

== History ==
There had been previous climate policy advisors in the White House fulfilling similar roles. Carol Browner was director of the now-defunct White House Office of Energy and Climate Change Policy from 2009 to 2011. Barack Obama had appointed Todd Stern to the role of special envoy for climate change in 2009. Stern later served as US chief negotiator for the Paris Agreement. Following Stern's departure in mid-2016, Jonathan Pershing took over as US climate envoy until the end of the administration.

In November 2020, President-elect Joe Biden announced former secretary of state John Kerry would serve in a newly created role as the first special presidential envoy for climate. This new position made him a member of the United States National Security Council (NSC). It was the first time that the NSC would have an official dedicated to climate change issues and to addressing the climate crisis as one affecting national security.

The term "climate czar" was used informally to describe Kerry's position.

On January 13, 2024, sources close to Kerry revealed that he would leave this position by the upcoming spring. Later that month, it was announced that John Podesta would succeed John Kerry as envoy.

The position has been left vacant in the second cabinet of Donald Trump.

=== Foreign visits ===
- April 2021: Envoy John Kerry became the first senior official of the Biden administration to visit China. On a visit to South Korea, Kerry discussed issues including the recent decision by Japan to dump radioactive water of the Fukushima nuclear plant into the Pacific.
- March 2023: London, Paris
- June 2023: Paris, Rome
- July 2023: China, during the 2023 Asia heat wave that set a new record of 52.2 °C (126.0 °F) in Sanbu, Xinjiang, China, which Kerry mentioned in particular.

== List of envoys ==
No.	Portrait	Officeholder	Term start	Term end	President
1		John Kerry	January 20, 2021	March 6, 2024	Joe Biden
2		John Podesta	March 6, 2024	January 20, 2025	Joe Biden

== See also ==
- White House National Climate Advisor
