= Major Economies Forum on Energy and Climate Change =

Major Economies Forum on Energy and Climate (MEF)
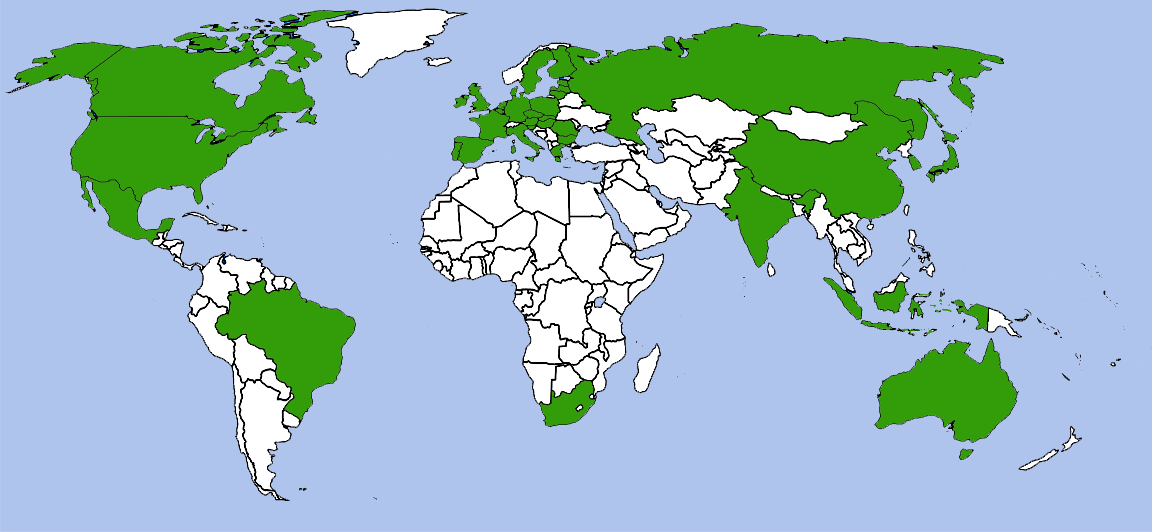
- MEF Members Argentina Australia Brazil Canada Chile China Egypt France Germany India Indonesia Italy Japan South Korea Mexico Nigeria Norway Russia Saudi Arabia South Africa Turkey United Arab Emirates United Kingdom United States Vietnam European Union

The Major Economies Forum on Energy and Climate (MEF) was launched on March 28, 2009. The MEF is intended to facilitate a candid dialogue among major developed and developing economies, help generate the political leadership necessary to achieve a successful outcome at the December UN climate change conference in Copenhagen, and advance the exploration of concrete initiatives and joint ventures that increase the supply of clean energy while cutting greenhouse gas emissions. Denmark, in its capacity as the President of the December 2009 Conference of the Parties to the UN Framework Convention on Climate Change, and the United Nations have also participated in this dialogue along with Observers.

As of June 2022, the 26 major economies participating in MEF are: Argentina, Australia, Brazil, Canada, Chile, China, Egypt, France, Germany, India, Indonesia, Italy, Japan, South Korea, Mexico, Nigeria, Norway, Russia, Saudi Arabia, South Africa, Turkey, the United Arab Emirates, the United Kingdom, the United States, Vietnam, and the European Union.

== History ==
The first preparatory meeting of the Major Economies Forum on Energy and Climate met April 27–28, 2009, in Washington, DC, attended by Leaders’ representatives and other officials from seventeen major economies, as well as the United Nations and Denmark. Participants welcomed President Obama's initiative in convening the Major Economies Forum. Discussion was open and candid. Participants agreed that the Forum is not an alternative to the UN Framework Convention process, but could inform and complement and make a major contribution to success in the UN negotiations in Copenhagen, as well as implementation of the Bali Roadmap.

The second preparatory meeting of the Major Economies Forum on Energy and Climate was convened in Paris, May 25–26, 2009, to inform and complement and make a contribution to success in the UN negotiations in Copenhagen, as well as implementation of the Bali Roadmap. Participants built on the initial discussions in Washington in April, reiterating that climate change demands immediate action by all major economies. They agreed on the importance of leadership by the major economies, including that their level of ambition should reflect science and that their robust national actions should contribute to credible long-term emissions reductions. They also shared the view that the transformation to a low-carbon economy can be an opportunity for growth and sustainable development.

The third preparatory meeting of the Major Economies Forum on Energy and Climate met in Jiutepec, Mexico, June 22–23, 2009. Participants agreed on the need for a strong political message in support of action on climate change including for a successful outcome in Copenhagen and at the upcoming Leaders’ Meeting in Italy, building on the outcome from the Leaders’ Meeting in Hokkaido Toyako, Japan, in July 2008. Participants continued active discussions on key elements that Leaders might focus on in their discussions including mitigation, financing, technology, and adaptation.

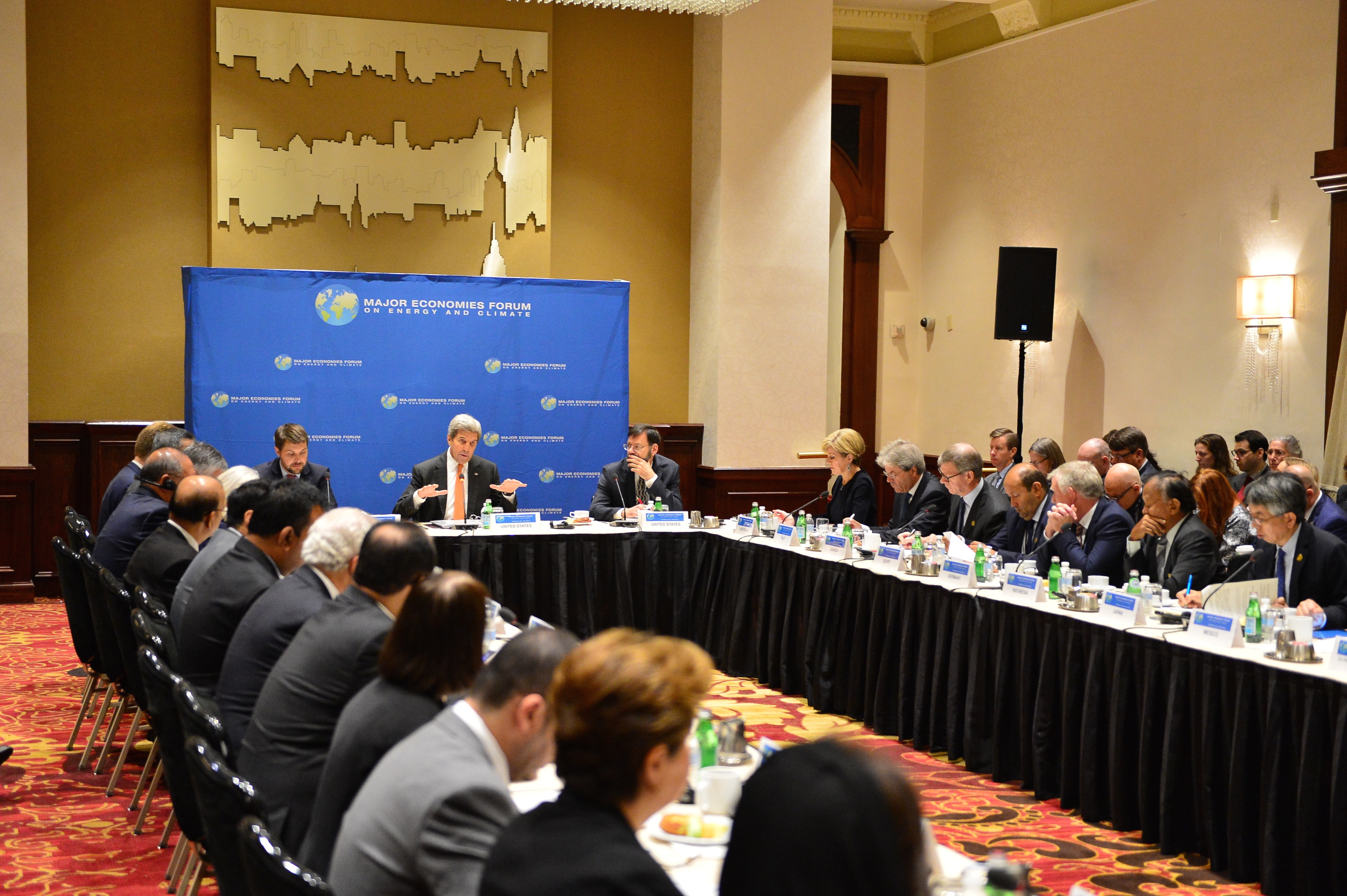
Meeting in September 2016

The First Leaders Meeting took place on July 9, 2009, in L'Aquila, Italy. The MEF Leaders discussed the vision for future cooperation on climate change, and released a Declaration Of The Leaders The Major Economies Forum On Energy And Climate.

The fourth meeting at the Leaders’ representative level of the Major Economies Forum on Energy and Climate met in Washington, DC, September 17–18, 2009. Participants agreed that the Forum continues to provide a useful opportunity to discuss key issues, explore new ideas, and identify points of shared understandings, as a contribution to the preparations for the Copenhagen Climate Conference in December 2009. There was wide interest in focusing on matters where discussions could help advance toward a convergence of views in Copenhagen. Participants continued their robust exchange of views on adaptation, mitigation, measuring, reporting, and verification, and technology at the session.

The fifth meeting at the Leaders’ representative level of the Major Economies Forum on Energy and Climate met in London, United Kingdom, October 18–19, 2009. To contribute to success at the Copenhagen Climate Conference, countries focused on finding convergence among their views on finance, technology, mitigation pathways, how to reflect mitigation commitments and actions, and means to improve transparency and accountability.

The sixth Meeting at the Leaders’ representative level of the Major Economies Forum on Energy and Climate met in Washington, DC, April 19, 2010. Participants agreed that smaller, informal discussions such as the Major Economies Forum contributed to success in Copenhagen and can facilitate and enrich the discussions under the UNFCCC, the multilateral forum for negotiating climate change. Parties also highlighted the importance of discussions being representative and transparent.

== Activities ==
The Leaders of the 17 MEF partners agreed that moving to a clean energy economy provides an opportunity to promote continued economic growth and sustainable development as part of a vigorous response to the danger posed by climate change. They identified an urgent need for deployment of clean energy technologies at the lowest possible cost, and established the Global Partnership to drive transformational progress. As an initial step, they requested a suite of Technology Action Plans, which now span ten climate-related technologies that together address more than 80% of the energy sector carbon dioxide (CO_{2}) emissions reduction potential identified by the IEA. MEF partners agreed to lead the work to develop the Technology Action Plans. These technologies include:

• Advanced Vehicles (Canada) • Bioenergy (Brazil and Italy) • Carbon Capture, Use & Storage (Australia and United Kingdom) • Energy Efficiency – Buildings Sector (United States) • Energy Efficiency – Industrial Sector (United States) • High-Efficiency, Low-Emissions (HELE) Coal (India and Japan) • Marine Energy (France) • Smart Grid (Italy and Korea) • Solar Energy (Germany and Spain) • Wind Energy (Denmark, Germany, and Spain)

Each of the Technology Action Plans contains a wealth of detail for countries to consider, including the (1) mitigation potential of the technology, (2) barriers and best practice strategies to overcome them, and (3) a menu of specific potential individual and collective country actions to move towards best practice policies as appropriate to their respective national circumstance and priorities. Such actions can help to reduce market barriers and realize the full potential of clean energy technologies.

== Meetings ==
- The First Leaders' Representatives Meeting, 27–28 April 2009 – Washington, DC, USA
- The Second Leaders' Representatives Meeting, 25–26 May 2009 – Paris, France
- The Third Leaders' Representatives Meeting, 22–23 June 2009 – Jiutepec, Mexico
- The First Leaders Meeting, 9 July 2009 – L'Aquila, Italy
- The Fourth Leaders' Representatives Meeting, 17–18 September 2009 – Washington, DC, USA
- The Fifth Leaders' Representatives Meeting, 18–19 October 2009 – London, United Kingdom
- The Sixth Leaders' Representatives Meeting, 19 April 2010 – Washington, DC, USA
- Clean Energy Ministerial, 19–20 July 2010 – Washington, DC, USA

...

- 12th Leaders' Representatives Meeting, 17–18 November 2011 - Cristal City (VA), USA
- 13th Leaders' Representatives Meeting, 17 April 2012 - Rome, Italy
- 14th Leaders' Representatives Meeting, 27 September 2012 - New York, USA

...

- 2015 1st Meeting 19–20 April 2015 – Washington, DC
- 2015 2nd Meeting, 18–19 July 2015 – Mondorf-les-Bains, Luxembourg
